= Jicamarca Radio Observatory =

Radio observatory in Lima, Peru

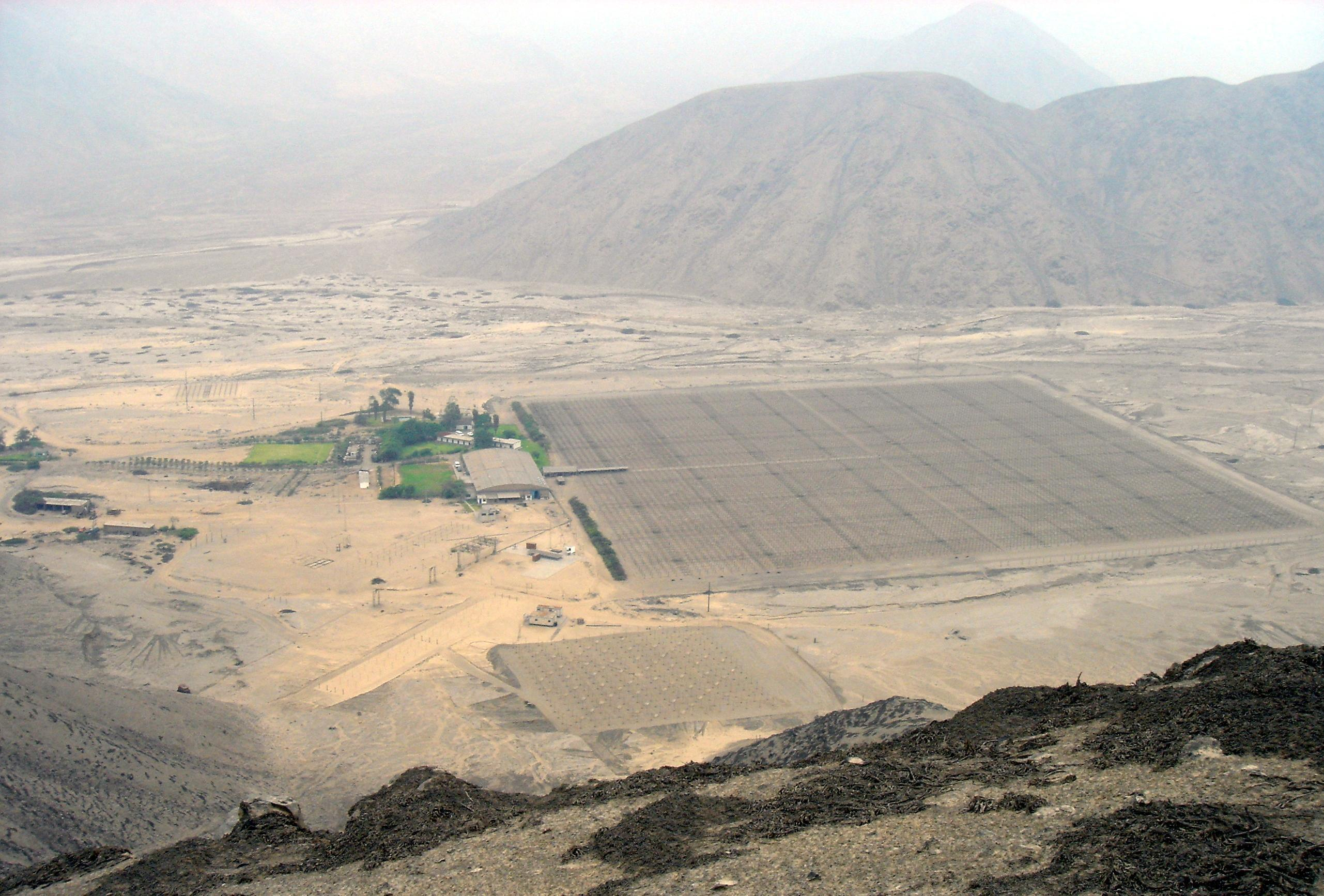
- Jicamarca Radio Observatory - Lima, Peru
- Location: Department of Lima, Peru
- Coordinates: 11°57′05″S 76°52′28″W
- Wavelength: 6 m (50 MHz)
- Collecting area: 82,944 m^{2} (892,800 sq ft)
- Website: jro.igp.gob.pe/english
- Location within Peru
- Related media on Commons

The Jicamarca Radio Observatory (JRO) is the equatorial anchor of the Western Hemisphere chain of Incoherent Scatter Radar (ISR) observatories extending from Lima, Peru to Søndre Strømfjord, Greenland. JRO is the premier scientific facility in the world for studying the equatorial ionosphere. The observatory is about half an hour drive inland (east) from Lima and 10 km from the Central Highway (11°57′05″S 76°52′27.5″W, 520 meters ASL). The magnetic dip angle is about 1°, and varies slightly with altitude and year. The radar can accurately determine the direction of the Earth's magnetic field (B) and can be pointed perpendicular to B at altitudes throughout the ionosphere. The study of the equatorial ionosphere is rapidly becoming a mature field due, in large part, to the contributions made by JRO in radio science.

JRO's main antenna is the largest of all the incoherent scatter radars in the world. The main antenna is a cross-polarized square array composed of 18,432 half-wavelength dipoles occupying an area of approximately 300m x 300m. The main research areas of the observatories are: the stable equatorial ionosphere, ionospheric field aligned irregularities, the dynamics of the equatorial neutral atmosphere and meteor physics.

The observatory is a facility of the Instituto Geofísico del Perú operated with support from the US National Science Foundation Cooperative Agreements through Cornell University.

== History ==
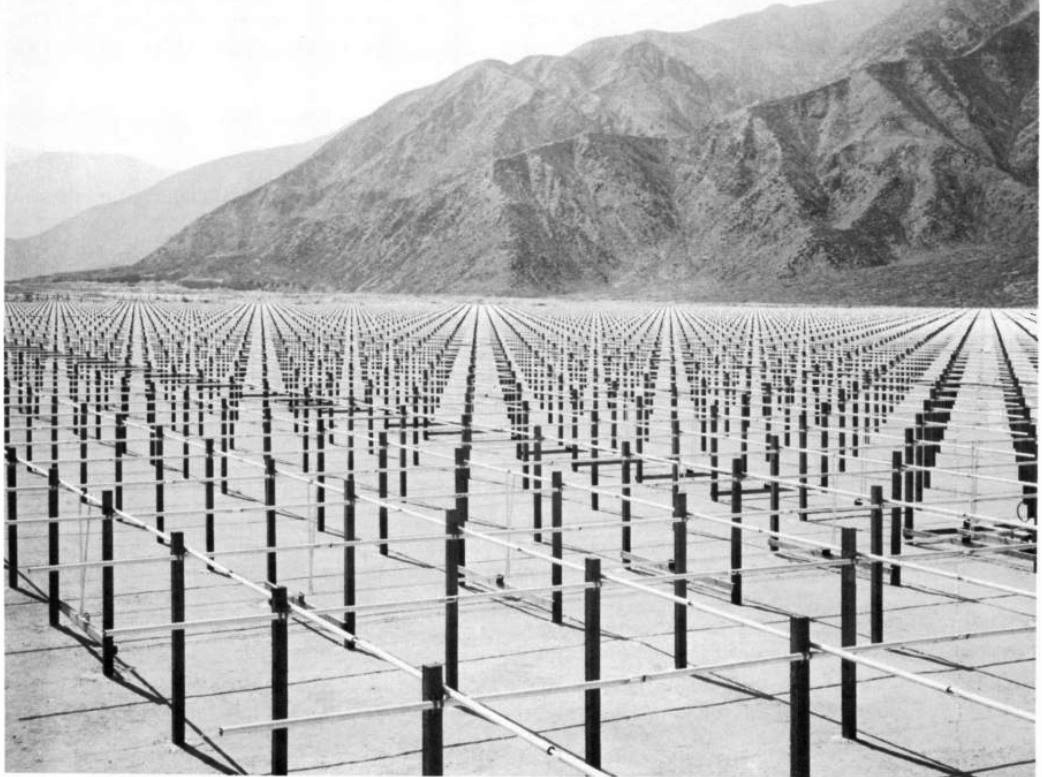
Closeup of the 9216 dipole antenna array after construction in 1962

The Jicamarca Radio Observatory was built in 1960–61 by the Central Radio Propagation Laboratory (CRPL) of the National Bureau of Standards (NBS). This lab later became part of the Environmental Science Service Administration (ESSA) and then the National Oceanic and Atmospheric Administration (NOAA). The project was led by Dr. Kenneth L. Bowles, who is known as the “father of JRO”.

Although the last dipole was installed on April 27, 1962, the first incoherent scatter measurements at Jicamarca were made in early August 1961, using part of the total area projected and without the transmitter's final stage. In 1969 ESSA turned the Observatory over to the Instituto Geofísico del Perú (IGP), which had been cooperating with CRPL during the International Geophysical Year (IGY) in 1957–58 and had been intimately involved with all aspects of the construction and operation of Jicamarca. ESSA and then NOAA continued to provide some support to the operations for several years after 1969, in major part due to the efforts of the informal group called “Jicamarca Amigos” led by Prof. William E. Gordon. Prof. Gordon invented the incoherent scatter radar technique in 1958.

A few years later the National Science Foundation began partially supporting the operation of Jicamarca, first through NOAA, and since 1979 through Cornell University via Cooperative Agreements. In 1991, a nonprofit Peruvian organization—called Ciencia Internacional (CI)—was created to hire most observatory staff members and to provide services and goods to the IGP to run the Observatory.

Since 1969, the great majority of the radar components have been replaced and modernized with “home made” hardware and software, designed and built by Peruvian engineers and technicians. More than 60 Ph.D. students, many from US institutions and 15 from Peru, have done their research in association with Jicamarca.

== Facilities ==
=== Main radar ===
JRO's main instrument is the VHF radar that operates on 50 MHz (actually on 49.9 MHz) and is used to study the physics of the equatorial ionosphere and neutral atmosphere. Like any other radar, its main components are: antenna, transmitters, receivers, radar controller, acquisition and processing system. The main distinctive characteristics of JRO's radar are: (1) the antenna (the largest of all the ISRs in the world) and (2) the powerful transmitters.

==== Radar components ====
- Antenna. The main antenna is a dual polarized antenna array that consists of 18,432 half-wavelength dipoles occupying an area of 288m x 288m. The array is subdivided in quarters, each quarter consisting of 4x4 modules. The main beam of the array can be manually steered +/- 3 degrees from its on-axis position, by changing cables at the module level. Being modular, the array can be configured in both transmission and reception on a variety of configurations, allowing for example: simultaneous multi-beam observations, applications of multi-baseline radar interferometry as well as radar imaging, etc.
- Transmitters. Currently, JRO has three transmitters, capable of delivering 1.5 MW peak power each. Soon a fourth transmitter will be finished to allow the transmission of 6 MW as in the early days. Each transmitter can be fed independently and can be connected to any quarter section of the main array. This flexibility allows the possibility of transmitting any polarization: linear, circular or elliptical.
- Other. The remaining components of the radar are constantly being changed and modernized according to the technology available. Modern electronic devices are used for assembling the receivers, radar controller and acquisition system. The first computer in Peru came to JRO in the early 1960s. Since then, different computer generations and systems have been used.

==== Radar modes of operation ====
The main radar operates in mainly two modes: (1) incoherent scatter radar (ISR) mode, and (2) coherent scatter (CSR) mode. In the ISR mode using the high power transmitter, Jicamarca measures the electron density, electron and ion temperature, ion composition and vertical and zonal electric fields in the equatorial ionosphere. Given its location and frequency of operation, Jicamarca has the unique capability of measuring the absolute electron density via Faraday rotation, and the most precise ionospheric electric fields by pointing the beam perpendicular to the Earth's magnetic field. In the CSR mode the radar measures the echoes that are more than 30 dB stronger than the ISR echoes. These echoes come from equatorial irregularities generated in troposphere, stratosphere, mesosphere, equatorial electrojet, E and F region. Given the strength of the echoes, usually low power transmitters and/or smaller antenna sections are used.

=== JULIA radar ===
JULIA stands for Jicamarca Unattended Long-term Investigations of the Ionosphere and Atmosphere, a descriptive name for a system designed to observe equatorial plasma irregularities and neutral atmospheric waves for extended periods of time. JULIA is an independent PC-based data acquisition system that makes use of some of the exciter stages of the Jicamarca main radar along with the main antenna array. In many ways, this system duplicates the function of the Jicamarca radar except that it does not use the main high-power transmitters, which are expensive and labor-intensive to operate and maintain. It can therefore run unsupervised for long intervals. With its pair of 30 kW peak power pulsed transmitters driving a (300 m)^2 modular antenna array, JULIA is a formidable coherent scatter radar. It is uniquely suited for studying the day-to-day and long-term variability of equatorial irregularities, which until now have only been investigated episodically or in campaign mode.

A large quantity of ionospheric irregularity data have been collected during CEDAR MISETA campaigns beginning in August, 1996, and continuing through the present. Data include daytime observations of the equatorial electrojet, 150 km echoes and nighttime observations of equatorial spread F.

=== Other instruments ===
Besides the main radar and JULIA, JRO hosts, and/or helps in the operations of, a variety of radars as well as radio and optical instruments to complement their main observations. These instruments are: various ground-based magnetometers distributed through Peru, a digital ionosonde, many GPS receivers in South America, an all-sky specular meteor radar, a bistatic Jicamarca-Paracas CSR for measuring E region electron density profile, scintillation receivers in Ancon, a Fabry–Perot Interferometer in Arequipa, a small prototype of AMISR UHF radar.

== Main research areas ==
The main research areas of JRO are the studies of: the equatorial stable ionosphere, the equatorial field aligned irregularities, equatorial neutral atmosphere dynamics, and meteor physics. Here are some examples of the JRO topics

- Stable ionosphere
  - Topside: What controls the light ion distribution? Why are the equatorial profiles so different from those at Arecibo? What is the storm time response of the topside?
  - F region: Do current theories fully explain electron and ion thermal balance? Do we understand the electron collision effects on ISR theory now? What is the effect of F-region dynamics near sunset on the generation of ESF plumes? What are the effects of N-S winds on inter-hemispheric transport?
  - E region: What are the basic background parameters in the equatorial E region? What is the morphology of the density profiles in this difficult to probe region? How does this morphology affect the E-region dynamo?
  - D region: What effects do meteor ablation and mesospheric mixing have on the composition in this region?
- Unstable Ionosphere
  - F region:
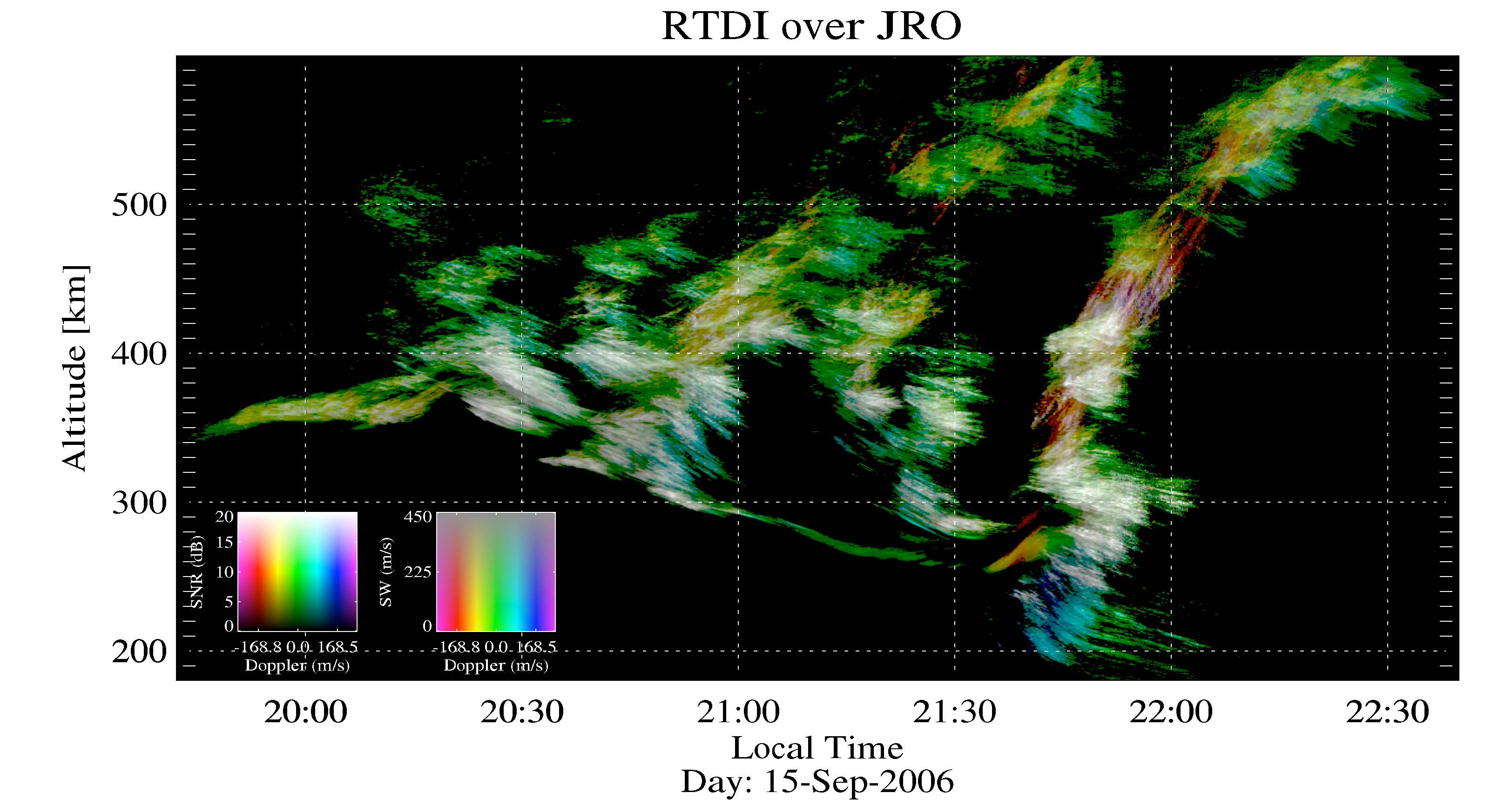
    Example of ESF range-time intensity radar map observed over the Jicamarca Radio Observatory. The Doppler information has been color-coded, where hue represents the mean Doppler, saturation the spectral width, and lightness the signal-to-noise ratio of the echoes.
    What are the fundamental plasma processes, including nonlinear processes, that govern the generation of plasma plumes? What are the precursor phenomena in the late afternoon F region that control whether or not an F-region plume will be generated after sunset?
  - Daytime Valley echoes (or so-called 150 km echoes). What are the physical mechanisms causing them? (still a puzzle after more than 40 years!).
  - E region: What are the nonlinear plasma physics processes that control the final state of the equatorial electrojet instabilities? To what extent do these instabilities affect the conductivity of the E region, and by extension, the conductivity of the auroral zone E region, where similar, but stronger and more complicated, instabilities exist?
  - Neutral atmosphere dynamics. What are the tidal components at low latitudes for the different seasons and altitudes? How strong are the wind shears in the mesosphere? What are the characteristics of gravity waves? Can we see evidence of lower atmosphere gravity wave coupling with the ionosphere?
  - Meteor physics. Where are the meteoroids coming from? What are the mass and size of the meteoroids? What is the equivalent visual magnitude of meteors detected at JRO? Can we use meteor echoes to diagnose the atmosphere/ionosphere at altitudes where they occur?

== Coherent scatter echoes ==
Most common ionospheric/atmospheric coherent echoes
| Echoes | Abbr. | Altitude (km) | Time of the day | Strength above ISR (dB) |
| Equatorial Electrojet | EEJ | 95-110; 90-130 | Daytime; Nighttime | 30-60; 20-50 |
| 150 km echoes | 150 km | 130-170 | Daytime | 10-30 |
| Neutral atmosphere | MST | 0.2-85 | All day | 30-50 |
| Meteor-head | Head | 85-130 | All day | 20-40 |
| Non-specular meteor | Non-specular | 95-115 | All day | 20-50 |
| Specular meteor | Specular | 80-120 | All day | 30-60 |

== Non-conventional studies ==
Besides the ISR and CSR observations, the main JRO system has been used as radio telescope, a VHF heater, and planetary radar. As radio telescope the main array has been used to study the Sun, radio stars (like Hydra), magnetosphere synchrotron radiation, Jupiter radiation. In the 1960s JRO was used as to study Venus and the surface of the Moon and more recently the Sun. Recently, the equatorial electrojet has been weakly modulated using JRO as a VHF heater to generate VLF waves.

== Summary of scientific contributions and milestones (since 1961) ==
- 1961. First observations of incoherent scatter echoes. First ISR in operation.
- 1961–63. Explanation of the physical processes behind the Equatorial electrojet plasma irregularities (Farley-Buneman instability.)
- 1962. First temperatures and composition measurements of the equatorial ionosphere.
- 1963 First electron density measurements of the equatorial Magnetosphere (the highest from ground based measurements even now).
- 1964.
  - First VHF radar echoes from Venus.
  - 1964. Discovery of the so-called 150 km echoes. The physical mechanisms behind these echoes are still (as of August 2008) a mystery.
- 1965. VHF radar measurements of the Moon's surface roughness. Test run and used by NASA in 1969 for the Apollo 11 with Neil Armstrong knew he was going to tread.
- 1965–69. Development of Faraday rotation and double pulse techniques. Jicamarca is the only ISR that uses this technique in order to obtain absolute electron density measurements in the ionosphere.
- 1967. Application of a complete theory about the incoherent spread that includes the effects of collisions between ions and the presence of the magnetic field. Gyro Resonance experiment that verified the complete theory of incoherent scatter.
- 1969. Development of the pulse-to-pulse technique to measure ionosphere Doppler shifts with very good precision. Later, the same technique was applied to Meteorological radars.
- 1969–72. First measurements of the zonal and vertical equatorial ionospheric drifts.
- 1971. Development of the radar interferometry technique to measure size and location of the echoing region.
- 1972–74. Development of the MST (Mesosphere, Stratosphere, Troposphere) radar to measure winds and clear air turbulence. Smaller versions of this type of radars are called wind profilers.
- Since 1974. Promotion and participation in international rocket campaigns to study atmospheric and ionospheric irregularities. JRO measurements complement the in-situ measurements perform with rockets launched from Punta Lobos, Peru.
- 1976. Explanation of the physics behind spread F irregularities
- 1981–82 Improvement of the radar interferometry technique to measure the zonal drifts of ionospheric irregularities (EEJ and ESF).
- 1987.
  - Development of the Frequency Domain Interferometry (FDI) technique that allows measurements of fine altitude structure of echoes.
  - 1987. Dr. Tor Hagfors, former JRO Director, received the URSI Balthasar van del Pol Gold Medal, for Contributions to radar engineering and the theory and experimental development of the incoherent scatter techniques”
- Since 1991. Development of the radar Imaging technique by Peruvian scientists and US colleagues. This technique permits the observation of fine angular structure inside the beam, and therefore discriminate between time and space ambiguities.
- 1993. Installation of the first MST radar in the Antarctica.
- 1994. First observations of Polar Mesosphere Summer Echoes (PMSE) in the Antarctica and discovery of a significant asymmetry with respect to Arctic echoes.
- 1996. Prof. Donald T. Farley, former JRO Director and Principal Investigator, received the URSI Appleton Prize for “Contributions to the development of the incoherent scatter radar technique and to radar studies of ionospheric instabilities”.
- 1997. First VHF radar on board of a scientific ship (BIC Humboldt), which has allowed the study of the PMSE in different Antarctic latitudes.
- 1999. Dr. Ronald F. Woodman, former JRO Director, received the URSI Appleton Prize for “Major contributions and leadership in radar studies of the ionosphere and neutral atmosphere”.
- 2000. Radar technique to “compress” antennas, using binary phase modulation of the antenna modules
- 2001. First electron density measurements of electrons between 90 and 120 km of altitude using a small bistatic radar system.
- 2002.
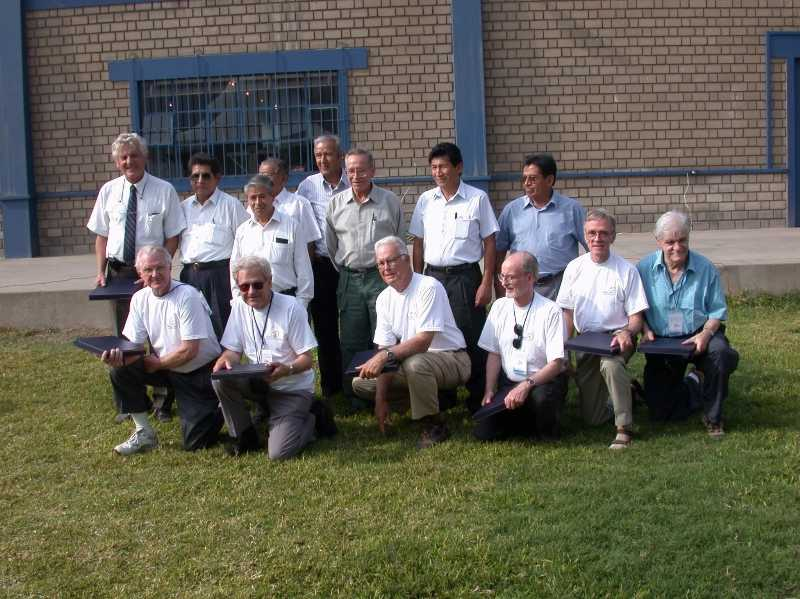
  Peruvian and foreign JRO staff from 1960 to 1969. Picture taken at JRO in May 2002 during the 40th Anniversary Workshop.
  - First observation of pure two stream E region irregularities during counter electric field conditions.
  - Jicamarca 40th Anniversary Workshop.
- Since 2003. Improved perpendicular to the magnetic field observations, accompanied by refinements in theory and computations, to measure simultaneously drifts and electron densities.
- 2004.
  - Unambiguous measurements of the ESF spectra in the topside using aperiodic pulsing.
  - Discovery of 150 km echoes using beams pointing away from perpendicular to the magnetic field.
- 2005. First E region zonal wind profiles from Equatorial electrojet echoes.
- 2006. Multi-radar observations of EEJ irregularities: VHF and UHF, vertical and oblique beams, and radar imaging.
- 2007. Identification of sporadic meteor populations using 90 hours of JRO's meteor head echoes.
- 2008.
  - First ISR full profile measurements of the equatorial ionosphere.
  - First observation of meteor shower from meteor-head echoes.
- 2009. Installation of a Fabry–Perot Interferometer at JRO (MeriHill Observatory).
- 2011. Deployment of a Mobile Fabry-Perot Interferometer at Nasca.

== JRO directors and principal investigators ==
- JRO directors
  - 1960–1963, Dr. Kenneth Bowles (Ph.D., Cornell University)
  - 1964–1967, Dr. Donald T. Farley (Ph.D., Cornell University)
  - 1967–1969, Dr. Tor Hagfors (Ph.D., Stanford University)
  - 1969–1974, Dr. Ronald Woodman (Ph.D., Harvard University)
  - 1974–1977, Dr. Carlos Calderón (Ph.D., Dartmouth College)
  - 1977–1980, Dr. Pablo Lagos (Ph.D., Massachusetts Institute of Technology)
  - 1980–2000, Dr. Ronald Woodman (Ph.D., Harvard University)
  - 2001–2012, Dr. Jorge L. Chau (Ph.D., University of Colorado)
  - 2012–2021, Dr. Marco Milla (Ph.D., University of Illinois at Urbana-Champaign)
  - 2021-present, Dr. Danny Scipión (Ph.D., University of Oklahoma)
- JRO Principal Investigators
  - 1979–2003, Prof. Donald T. Farley (Ph.D. Cornell University)
  - 2004–present, Prof. David L. Hysell (Ph.D. Cornell University)

== See also ==
- EISCAT
- Arecibo Observatory
- Millstone Hill Observatory
- Sondrestrom Upper Atmospheric Research Facility
