= Field-aligned irregularity =

A field-aligned irregularity (FAI) is an anisotropic (different values when measured in different directions) perturbation of plasma density associated with magnetic fields. FAIs are often thought of in the context of the Earth's ionosphere where several natural processes generate FAIs in the E-region and F-region.

They occur at 50 and 140 MHz, where electrons associated with the event become vertically aligned with Earth's magnetic field. FAI may occur for several hours after it starts. Optimum times for observance appear to be between 8 PM and midnight.
