= Walter Dieminger =

German physicist

- Born: July 7, 1907; Würzburg, Germany
- Died: September 29, 2000 (aged 93); Northeim, Germany
- Education: Technical University of Munich
- Scientific career
- Workplaces: Max Planck Institute for Aeronomy 1955–1975
- Doctoral advisor: Jonathan Zenneck

Walter Dieminger (July 7, 1907 – September 29, 2000) was a German space scientist and director of Germany's Max Planck Institute for Aeronomy from 1955 to 1975. Dieminger's research was focused on the ionosphere.

== Life and work ==
Dieminger studied physics between 1926 and 1935 at the Technical University of Munich. After receiving his Ph.D. for work on electromagnetic waves and the ionosphere with Jonathan Zenneck, he worked at the Deutsche Versuchsanstalt für Luftfahrt (German Experimental Institute for Aviation). With his focus on research of the ionosphere and electromagnetic waves at his new institute, called the Zentralstelle für Funkberatung (Central Counseling Office for Radio Communication). Applying a code invented by his cooperator Karl Rawer he was able to make predictions on shortwave communication for the military and the police. The institute at Leobersdorf continued to monitor the ionosphere until the end of World War II.

A group of British physicists supervised the dissolution of the institute. The ionospheric physicist William Roy Piggott opposed the dissolution and managed to transfer most of its scientists and equipment to Lindau am Harz in the British sector of Germany. This research institute became later, after several name changes, the Max Planck Institute for Ionospheric Research in 1948.

Dieminger became the director of the institute in 1951, which was renamed the Max Planck Institute for Aeronomy in 1958. He continued his research of the upper atmosphere and was able to participate in several international collaborations. For example, he established a station for ionospheric observations in Tsumeb, Namibia and cooperated with the Finnish EISCAT facility in Sodankylä. Dieminger was one of the most active scientists in the International Union of Radio Science (URSI): Vice-President 1963-69, President 1969-72. He retired in 1975 but continued with his research. He died in 2000 in Northeim.

== Honors ==
Dieminger was a member of several academic societies including the German Academy of Sciences Leopoldina, Austrian Academy of Sciences, International Academy of Astronautics and the Finnish Academy of Sciences. He was made an honorary citizen of Katlenbug-Lindau in 1975 and received the Federal Cross of Merit in 1975.
