= Donald T. Farley =

American physicist (1933–2018)

Donald Thorn Farley Jr. (October 26, 1933 – May 13, 2018) was an American physicist and Professor of Engineering at Cornell University who pioneered the use of radar remote sensing of the earth's ionosphere. He developed the theory and technique of incoherent scatter observation of the thermal fluctuations of plasma. About 80 percent of all ionospheric radio scientists in the United States who practice incoherent scatter were trained by Farley, or by his students. Farley was the J. Preston Levis Professor of Engineering at Cornell University. His principal collaborators included John Dougherty, Tor Hagfors, Bela Fejer, Ronald Woodman, Michael Kelley, and Wesley Swartz.
