= Tor Hagfors =

Norwegian physicist

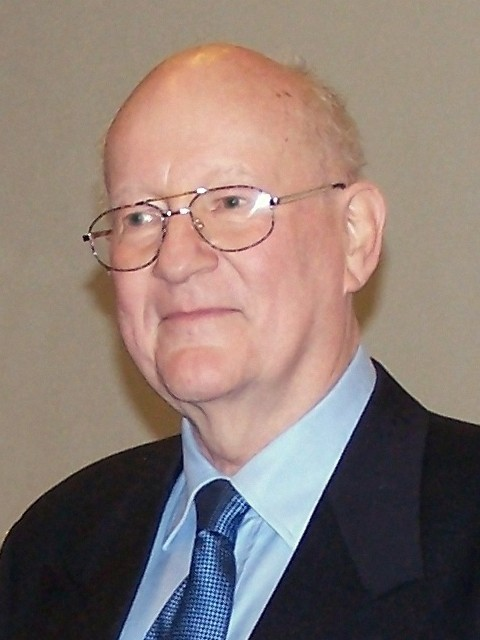
Tor Hagfors

Tor Hagfors (18 December 1930 – 17 January 2007) was a Norwegian scientist, radio astronomer, radar expert and a pioneer in the studies of the interactions between electromagnetic waves and plasma. In the early 1960s he was one of a handful of pioneering theorists that independently developed a theory that explained the scattering of radio waves by the free electrons in a plasma and applied the result to the ionosphere. He became founding director of the new EISCAT facilities that were then under construction in 1975, by which time he already been director at most of the other incoherent scatter radar facilities in the world. The asteroid 1985 VD1 is named 7279 Hagfors after him.

== Early life ==
Tor Hagfors was born in Oslo in 1930. He studied at the Norwegian Institute of Technology (NTH) and received his doctorate degree in 1959 from the University of Oslo.

== Scientific work ==
Hagfors worked at the Norwegian Defence Research Establishment from 1955 to 1963, interrupted by a sabbatical at Stanford University from 1959 to 1960. He was employed at the Lincoln Laboratory in Lexington, Massachusetts in two periods, from 1963 to 1967 and from 1969 to 1971. In the early 1960s he was one of a handful of pioneering theorists (others included Don Farley (who worked with John Dougherty) at Cornell, Ron Woodman (Harvard), Jules Fejer (UCSD), and E. E. Salpeter (also at Cornell)) that all independently developed a theory that explained the scattering of radio waves by the free electrons in a plasma and applied the result to the ionosphere. It is remarkable that despite the distinct approaches used they obtained identical results. A complete modern treatment of this topic was published in early 2011 by Erhan Kudeki and Marco Milla (both at the University of Illinois).

From 1967 to 1969 he was director of the Jicamarca Radio Observatory in Lurigancho, outside Lima, Peru. Between 1971 and 1973 he was site director at the Arecibo Observatory. He lectured electrical engineering at NTH from 1973 to 1982, and in 1975 he became the first director of the EISCAT scientific association, when the organization's facilities in northern Scandinavia were constructed. He held that position until 1982 when he returned to Cornell to direct NAIC.

From October 1982 to September 1992 Hagfors was director of the National Astronomy and Ionosphere Center (NAIC) at Cornell University in Ithaca NY, which operated the Arecibo Observatory in Puerto Rico until September 30, 2011, and professor of astronomy and electrical engineering at Cornell University.

In 1992 he was appointed director of the Max Planck Institute for Aeronomy in Lindau (Katlenburg-Lindau) in Germany, a position he held until his retirement in 1998. Hagfors was chairman of EISCAT Council from 1995 to 1996, chairman of the space science committee in the Norwegian Research Council from 1992 to 1997, and member of the Norwegian Academy of Science and Letters since 1995. He was a visiting scholar at the University of Tromsø, Norway, Nagoya University in Japan, and Lancaster University in Great Britain.

Hagfors's research was very broad, comprising amongst other things ionospheric modification (heating), radar astronomy within the Solar System, observations of planetary surfaces from space, techniques in radio remote sensing, scattering from rough surfaces, thermal fluctuations in complex plasmas, antennas and radio wave propagation. He published around 170 scientific papers.

== Death ==
Tor Hagfors died of a heart attack in Puerto Rico on 17 January 2007.

== Honours ==
Asteroid 1985 VD1 was named 7279 Hagfors in 2000.

== Awards ==
- 1987 URSI Van der Pol Gold Medal
- 1989 Senior Humboldt fellowship
- 1995 Member of the Norwegian Academy of Science and Letters
- 1998 Associate member, Royal Astronomical Society
- 2002 EISCAT's Sir Granville Beynon medal
- 2002 Doctor honoris causa University of Oulu
- 2003 Honorary doctor University of Tromsø
- 2003 William E. Gordon and Elva Gordon distinguished lecture at the Arecibo Observatory on November 3, 2003.

Preceded by Donald T. Farley	Director, Jicamarca Radio Observatory; 1967–1969	Succeeded by Ron Woodman
Preceded by N/A	First Director, EISCAT Scientific Association; 1975–1982	Succeeded by Murray Baron
Preceded by Hal Craft	Director of National Astronomy and Ionosphere Center; 1982–1992	Succeeded by Paul Goldsmith
Preceded by Ian Axford	Director of Max Planck Institute for Aeronomy; 1992–1998	Succeeded by Sami Solanki
