= F region =

Layer in ionosphere

The F region of the ionosphere is home to the F layer of ionization, also called the Appleton–Barnett layer, after the English physicist Edward Appleton and New Zealand physicist and meteorologist Miles Barnett. As with other ionospheric sectors, 'layer' implies a concentration of plasma, while 'region' is the volume that contains the said layer. The F region contains ionized gases at a height of around 150–800 km (93–497 mi) above sea level, placing it in the Earth's thermosphere, a hot region in the upper atmosphere, and also in the heterosphere, where chemical composition varies with height. Generally speaking, the F region has the highest concentration of free electrons and ions anywhere in the atmosphere. It may be thought of as comprising two layers, the F1 and F2 layers.

The F-region is located directly above the E region (formerly the Kennelly-Heaviside layer) and below the protonosphere. It acts as a dependable reflector of HF radio signals as it is not affected by atmospheric conditions, although its ionic composition varies with the sunspot cycle. It reflects normal-incident frequencies at or below the critical frequency (approximately 10 MHz) and partially absorbs waves of higher frequency.

== F1 and F2 layers ==
The F1 layer is the lower sector of the F layer and exists from about 150 to 220 km (93 to 137 mi) above the surface of the Earth and only during daylight hours. It is composed of a mixture of molecular ions O_{2}^{+} and NO^{+}, and atomic ions O^{+}. Above the F1 region, atomic oxygen becomes the dominant constituent because lighter particles tend to occupy higher altitudes above the turbopause (at ~90 km; 56 mi). This atomic oxygen provides the O^{+} atomic ions that make up the F2 layer. The F1 layer has approximately 5 × 10^{5} e/cm^{3} (free electrons per cubic centimeter) at noontime and minimum sunspot activity, and increases to roughly 2 × 10^{6} e/cm^{3} during maximum sunspot activity. The density falls off to below 10^{4} e/cm^{3} at night.

- The F_{1} layer merges into the F_{2} layer at night.
- Though fairly regular in its characteristics, it is not observable everywhere or on all days. The principal reflecting layer during the summer for paths of 2,000 to 3,500 km (1,200 to 2,200 mi) is the F_{1} layer. However, this depends upon the frequency of a propagating signal. The E layer electron density and resultant MUF, maximum usable frequency, during high solar activity periods can refract and thus block signals of up to about 15 MHz from reaching the F1 and F2 regions, with the result that distances are much shorter than possible with refractions from the F1 and F2 regions, but extremely low radiation-angle signals (lower than about 6 degrees) can reach distances of 3,000 km (1,900 mi) via E region refractions.
- The F_{2} layer exists from about 220 to 800 km (140 to 500 mi) above the surface of the Earth. The F_{2} layer is the principal reflecting layer for HF radio communications during both day and night. The horizon-limited distance for one-hop F_{2} propagation is usually around 4,000 km (2,500 mi). The F_{2} layer has about 10^{6} e/cm^{3}. However, variations are usually large, irregular, and particularly pronounced during magnetic storms. The F layer behaviour is dominated by the complex thermospheric winds.

== Usage in radio communication ==
Critical F_{2} layer frequencies are the frequencies that will not go through the F_{2} layer. Under rare atmospheric conditions, F2 propagation can occur, resulting in VHF television and FM radio signals being received over great distances, well beyond the normal 40–100 miles (64–161 km) reception area.
