= JRO =

JRO may refer to:

- J. Robert Oppenheimer (1904–1967), American physicist known for his work with the Manhattan Project
- Jet and Replication Objects library; see Microsoft Data Access Components
- Jicamarca Radio Observatory, an observatory
- Kilimanjaro International Airport, in Tanzania
