= Heaviside layer =

Heaviside layer may refer to:

- Kennelly–Heaviside layer, a layer in the Earth's atmosphere
- A fictional afterlife in the musical Cats
