= TeleSoft =

TeleSoft, Inc. (sometimes written Telesoft) was an American software development company founded in 1981 and based in San Diego, California, that specialized in development tools for the Ada programming language.

== History ==
In 1981, University of California, San Diego (UCSD) professor Kenneth Bowles was looking to do for the emergent Ada programming language what the UCSD Pascal and the UCSD p-System language translator and operating system had done for the Pascal programming language and world. He thus founded a company called Telesoftware, which soon merged with another UCSD-offshoot company Renaissance Systems, founded by Craig Maudlin and Christopher Klein, to form TeleSoft. The early merged company initially sold various Motorola 68000-based systems and software.

TeleSoft got off to a fast start in the Ada compiler market, releasing its first product in May 1981, well before the new language standard became final. TeleSoft had thus put out the first commercially available Ada compiler. Bowles took an-earlier-than-usual status as an emeritus professor at UCSD in 1984 in order to focus his attentions on TeleSoft. The company was able to obtain funding, including $2 million in venture capital funding in 1984.

The first generation TeleSoft compiler was very slow, but compilation speeds improved considerably with the TeleGen2 product. TeleSoft sold both native compilers and cross compilers for various embedded systems architectures. The customer base for the compiler grew to include many large corporations, including IBM, Sun Microsystems, Intel, Cray Research, Motorola, and Unisys.

The Ada software environment was originally thought to be a promising market, with a number of small, new companies including TeleSoft seeking to gain a foothold in it. But the Ada compiler business proved to be a difficult one to be in; many of the advantages of the language for general-purpose programming were not seen as such by the general software engineering community or by educators. By the late 1980s, TeleSoft had suffered two rounds of layoffs. Still privately held, in 1988 it reportedly had revenue of $18 million and some 235 employees.

== Company sale and subsequent history ==
TeleSoft was acquired in 1989 by Swedish Telecom and merged with that company's subsidiary Telelogic to form an entity known as Telesoft AB. TeleSoft president Ben Goodwin became the head of the new company. Swedish Telecom was a heavy user of Ada and Telelogic wanted to bolster its offerings in that area. Bowles sold his interest in TeleSoft as part of this transaction; he would go on to participate for several years in the ISO committee responsible for the Ada 95 standardization effort.

But the Ada industry underwent further consolidations. Telelogic soon reduced its development of Ada tools. At the end of 1992, TeleSoft was merged into Alsys, founded by chief Ada designer Jean Ichbiah, which itself had been acquired in 1991 by French defense contractor Thomson-CSF; more mergers, acquisitions, divestitures and the like would follow.
