= Ionospheric absorption =

Attenuation diagram, day and night

Ionospheric absorption (ISAB) is the scientific name for absorption occurring as a result of the interaction between various types of electromagnetic waves and the free electrons in the ionosphere, which can interfere with radio transmissions.

== Description ==
Ionosphere absorption is of critical importance when radio networks, telecommunication systems or interlinked radio systems are being planned, particularly when trying to determine propagation conditions.

The ionosphere can be described as an area of the atmosphere in which radio waves on shortwave bands are refracted or reflected back to Earth. As a result of this reflection, which is often very crucial in the long-distance propagation of radio waves, some of the shortwave signal strength is decreased. In this regard, ISAB is the primary limiting factor in radio propagation.

== Attenuation mechanics ==
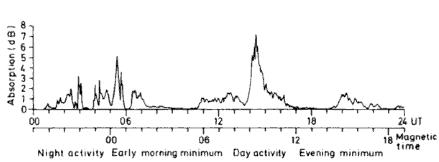
Chart of Attenuation

ISAB is only a factor in the period of the day where radio signals travel through the portion of the ionosphere facing the Sun. The solar wind and radiation cause the ionosphere to become charged with electrons. At night, the atmosphere becomes drained of its charge, and radio signals can go much further with less loss of signal. In particular, low frequency signals that would be attenuated to nothing during the day will be received much further away at night.

The specific amount of attenuation can be derived as a function of the Inverse-square law. The lower the frequency, the greater the attenuation.

Relative ionospheric absorption can be measured using a riometer.

== See also ==
- Radio horizon
- Sudden Ionospheric Disturbance
