= Kenneth Bowles =

American computer scientist

Kenneth L. Bowles
- Born: c.1929
- Died: August 15, 2018; Solana Beach, California, U.S.
- Education: Cornell University (Ph.D. 1955)
- Known for: UCSD Pascal
- Scientific career
- Fields: Computer science
- Workplaces: University of California, San Diego
- Doctoral advisor: Henry G. Booker

Kenneth L. "Ken" Bowles (c. 1929 – August 15, 2018) was an American computer scientist best known for his work in initiating and directing the UCSD Pascal project, when he was a professor of computer science at the University of California, San Diego (UCSD).

== Education ==
Bowles received his PhD under Henry G. Booker at Cornell University in 1955 for radar studies of the Aurora Borealis.

== Career ==
Starting in 1960, Bowles worked for the Central Radio Propagation Lab, National Bureau of Standards, where he directed the construction and research use of the Jicamarca Radio Observatory near Lima Peru. That work involved heavy use of computers for signal analysis to study the earth's ionosphere and magnetosphere.

In 1965, Bowles was invited by Prof. Henry Booker to help him start the Applied ElectroPhysics Department at UCSD. They were tasked to start and organize a new department of applied engineering physics (AEP).

While starting to establish a new radio astronomy experiment near UCSD for studies of the Sun's ionized atmosphere, the concentration on computer analysis led UCSD to appoint Bowles as computer center director in 1968. He introduced interactive computing to UCSD, but returned to full-time teaching in 1974 when budget pressures made computer centers very controversial.

In an effort to increase student use of computers while also reducing costs, Bowles wanted to take advantage of small computer price/benefit. Urs-Ammann's P-machine allowed Pascal to be implemented on a variety of machines. With graduate student Mark Overgaard and a supporting team of undergraduates, he then set out to provide low cost instructional computing services to the majority of UCSD students using small computers. Between late 1974 and 1980, that project grew into the UCSD Pascal Project.

Computer center directorship: when Bowles' work on the university search committee failed to produce a new director for UCSD's computing center, UCSD's chancellor convinced Bowles to take the job himself in 1968. Bowles was all but forced out in 1974 when the university relieved him of much of his authority as director of the UCSD computing center while he was away on a lecturing trip to the University of Oxford. There was a disagreement in priorities. Bowles wanted numerous machines to give students hands-on experience with interactive computing. The university instead committed to the purchase of a large IBM mainframe and set the center's priorities on business process support for the university administration.

The UCSD Pascal Project caused some controversy, with Pascal purists unhappy with UCSD Pascal extensions to the language. Some of these extensions are now present in modern Pascal compilers.

As the UCSD Pascal Project grew, it was necessary for the project to leave UCSD by licensing the software to a commercial vendor. The UCSD concerns about taxes forced the project to be licensed to SofTech Microsystems, taking effect 1 June 1979.

Bowles then started a small software development company, soon to be called TeleSoft, which became a principal supplier of compilers for the Ada programming language worldwide. He took early emeritus status in 1984 in order to concentrate his attentions at TeleSoft. After selling his part interest in TeleSoft in 1989, he participated for several years in the ISO committee responsible for the Ada 95 revision of the language.

In retirement Bowles enjoyed photography, mostly of the wild-flowers of San Diego County and birds of the south-western USA.

== Students ==
Principal project members and students of Bowles include:

- Mark Allen
- Joel McCormack

== See also ==
- List of University of California, San Diego people
