= William Roy Piggott =

William Roy Piggott (18 July 1914 – 20 May 2008) was an English nuclear physicist. He was a student of Sir Edward Appleton who transferred a large group of German specialists from Austria into the British Zone of Occupation in Germany in 1945. He edited the still valid official booklet of reduction rules for ionospheric soundings with Karl Rawer and was engaged in international activities during the International Geophysical Year (IGY) and for a long time afterwards.

== Biography ==
Before the Second World War, Piggott was experimenting in nuclear physics. Seriously contaminated, he switched over to the Cavendish Laboratory Cambridge with studies of the ionosphere and of Shortwave propagation, then for many decades at Radio Research Station Slough, again under Sir Edward. In order to collect German scientific results in his field, when he was ordered to dissolve Walter Dieminger´s relevant German organization. When he came to Austria where the German group had arrived, he decided, despite his orders, to save that group for Britain by transferring it into the British zone of Germany. Pretending an order of Sir Edward he assembled about 100 lorries and relevant British military personnel to drive the group unnoticed over two frontiers of occupation zones into the British zone of Germany. Military radio supervision, however, seized his communications and attributed these erroneously to a manoeuvre in the Russian occupation zone. The matter was estimated to be serious and was brought up to Sir Winston Churchill, who was amused by this. Piggott was dismissed with a reprimand.

Piggot was actively engaged with the International Geophysical Year, first by his co-authorship in the series of "Instruction Manuals" then as a member of an ionospheric "World wide soundings Committee", established by the International Union of Radio Science (URSI). For the first time this group produced international rules for reducing ionospheric records (ionograms). With Karl Rawer, he edited these rules with explanations in an official, still valid edition of the "URSI Monographs" During several decades, "Uncle Roy" patiently advised the station personal. Later Piggott concentrated his interest on the ionosphere in the Polar regions. He became the head of atmospheric sciences at the British Antarctic Survey, and visited that organization's Halley Research Station and intensively studied the data it obtained.
