= S4 Index =

Parameter used to measure ionospheric disturbances

The $S_4$ Index is a standard index used to measure ionospheric disturbances. It is defined as the ratio of the standard deviation of signal intensity to the average signal intensity.

== Real Time data ==
This parameter is displayed in real time by many institutions:

- at Arecibo Observatory
- at Cornell University
- at INPE, in Brasil
