= Riometer =

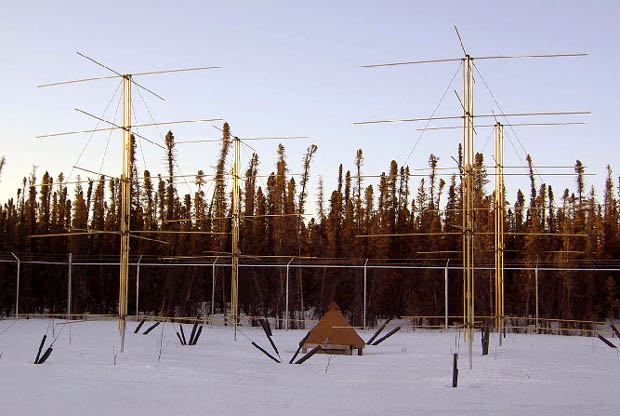
30 MHz HAARP riometer.

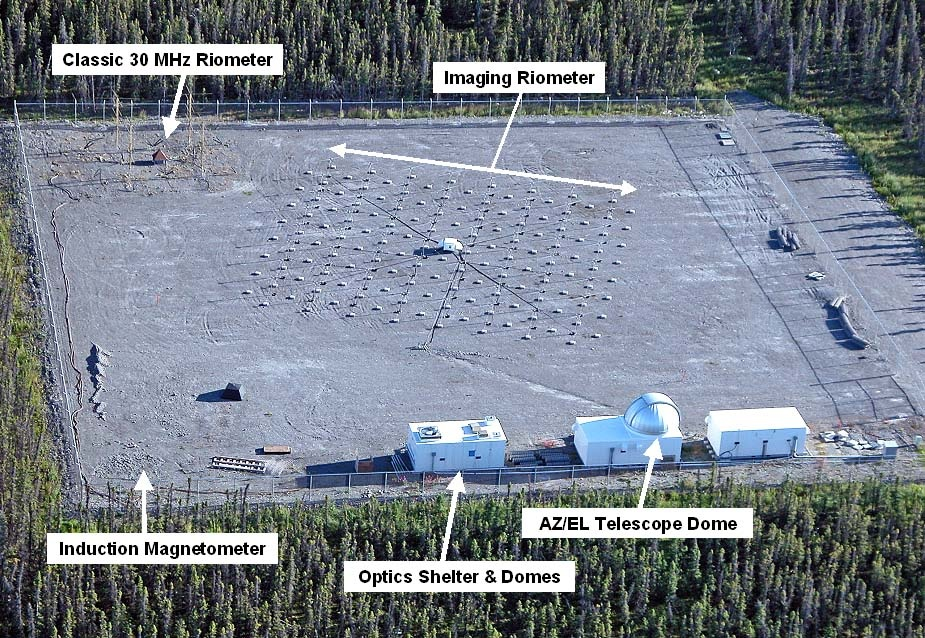
HAARP antennas.

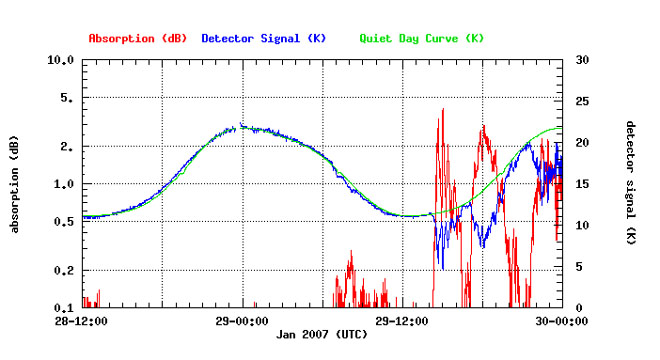
Chart of the VHF riometer at HAARP from UTC 2007-01-28, 12:00 until UTC 2007-01-30, 00:00. It shown an event which causes an increased ionospheric absorption.

A riometer (commonly relative ionospheric opacity meter, although originally: Relative Ionospheric Opacity Meter for Extra-Terrestrial Emissions of Radio noise) is an instrument used to quantify the amount of electromagnetic-wave ionospheric absorption in the atmosphere. As the name implies, a riometer measures the "opacity" of the ionosphere to radio noise emanating from cosmic origin. In the absence of any ionospheric absorption, this radio noise, averaged over a sufficiently long period of time, forms a quiet-day curve. Increased ionization in the ionosphere will cause absorption of radio signals (both terrestrial and extraterrestrial), and a departure from the quiet-day curve. The difference between the quiet-day curve and the riometer signal is an indicator of the amount of absorption, and is measured in decibels. Riometers are generally passive radio antenna operating in the VHF radio frequency range (~30-40 MHz). Electromagnetic radiation of that frequency is typically Galactic synchrotron radiation and is absorbed in the Earth's D region of the ionosphere.

== Description ==
The riometer was developed in the mid-1950s by scientists at the University of Alaska who were researching the radio propagation effects of aurorae. At times aurorae resulted in complete failure of long-distance radio communication to planes in the Arctic - a matter of considerable concern to the US Air Force at a time of tension with the Soviet Union. Riometers are still used today for ionospheric research and are typically located in polar and sub-polar areas.

Initially, riometers were single, wide-beam detectors and measured the cosmic noise absorption (CNA). Multi-beam riometers have also been developed, which have multiple narrow beams, typically formed by a Butler matrix on a phased antenna array. Each beam forms its own riometer and has its own quiet-day curve determination. These individual beams form pixels on the sky allowing simple images of cosmic noise absorption to be formed. More recently, interferometry has been used to provide all-sky, spatially-continuous imaging of CNA. It is also possible to use riometers to observe multiple frequencies (typically in the range 25-40 MHz). An inverse problem technique can be applied to the measurements to ascertain not just the absorption, but a model of the electron content as a function of sight distance.
