= Arthur E. Kennelly =

American electrical engineer and mathematician (1861–1939)

Arthur Kennelly
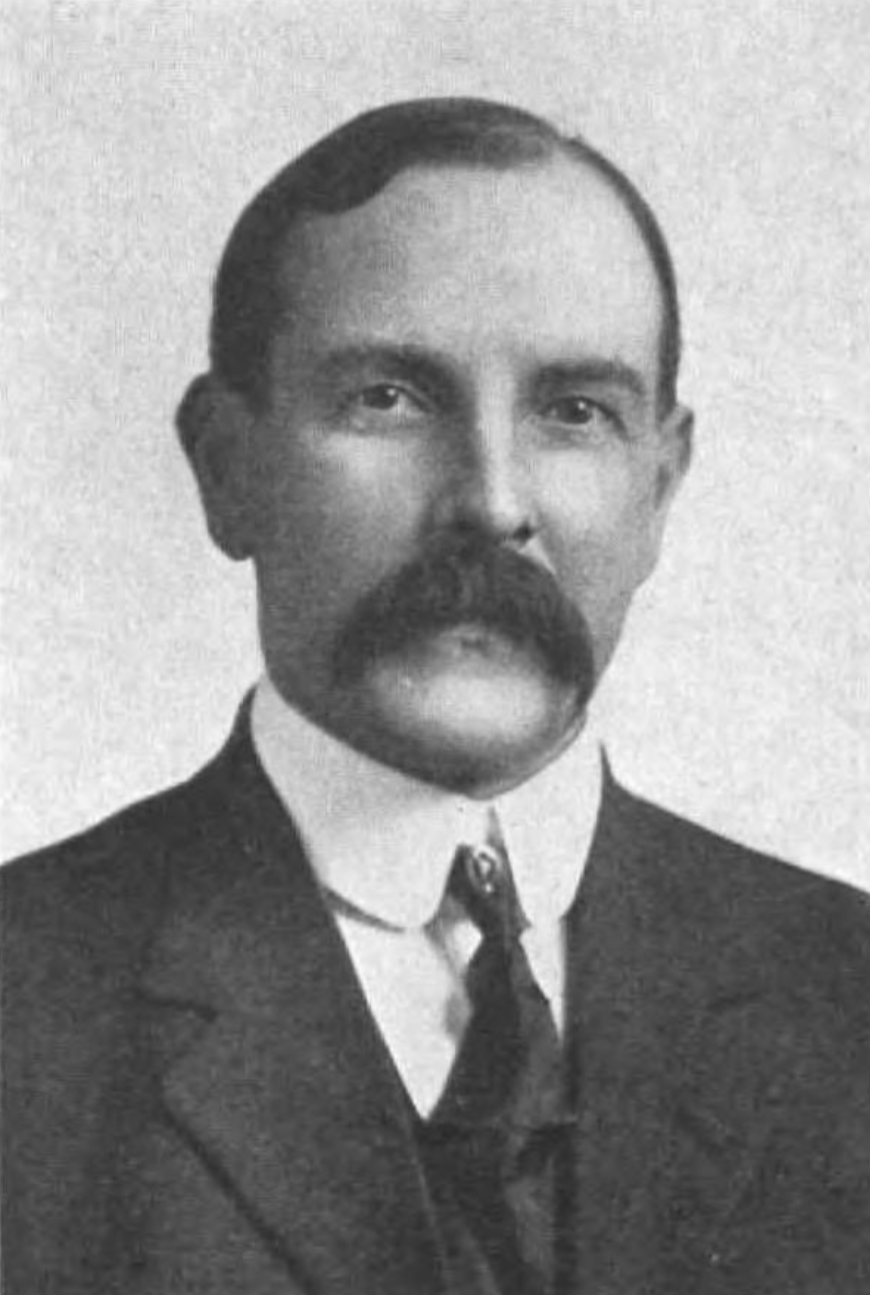
- Kennelly in 1915
- Born: December 17, 1861; Colaba, British Raj
- Died: June 18, 1939 (aged 77); Boston, Massachusetts, U.S.
- Education: University College School
- Known for: Kennelly–Heaviside layer; Electrical impedance; Y-Δ transform
- Awards: Howard N. Potts Medal (1918); IRE Medal of Honor (1932); AIEE Edison Medal (1933)
- Scientific career
- Fields: Electrical engineering; Mathematics
- Workplaces: West Orange Laboratory; Harvard University; Massachusetts Institute of Technology
- Doctoral students: Vannevar Bush
- Other notable students: Edith Clarke

Arthur Edwin Kennelly (December 17, 1861 – June 18, 1939) was an American electrical engineer and mathematician.

== Biography ==
=== Early life ===
Arthur Edwin Kennelly was born on December 17, 1861, in Colaba, Bombay Presidency, British Raj, the son of Catherine (née Heycock) and David Joseph Kennelly. His father was from Cork, Ireland, while his mother was from Leeds, England. His mother died in 1864, when he was three-years-old. In 1868, Arthur and his father left Bombay and moved to England, where he was educated at University College School.

=== Career and research ===
Kennelly joined Thomas Edison's West Orange Laboratory in December 1887, staying until March 1894. While there, he had a role in the war of currents, assisting anti-alternating current crusader Harold P. Brown in developing a demonstration to show how alternating current was more dangerous than direct current as well as a further test to determine the type of electricity that should be used in the electric chair, convincing officials that it should be alternating current.

Kennelly then formed a consulting firm in electrical engineering with Edwin Houston. Together they wrote Alternating Electric Currents (1895), Electrical Engineering leaflets (1896), and Electric arc lighting (1902). In 1893, during his research in electrical engineering, he presented a paper on impedance to the American Institute of Electrical Engineers (AIEE). He researched the use of complex numbers as applied to Ohm's law in alternating current circuit theory. In 1902, he investigated the electrical properties of the upper atmosphere's radio spectrum, resulting in the concept of the Kennelly–Heaviside layer. The same year, he was given the entire engineering charge of the expedition which laid Mexican submarine cables on the route Vera Cruz–Frontera–Campeche. He also served as inspector for the Mexican Government during the manufacture of the cable. He was a professor of electrical engineering at Harvard University (1902–1930) and jointly at the Massachusetts Institute of Technology (1913–1924). One of his students at MIT was Vannevar Bush.

In 1911 and 1912, Kennelly advanced applied mathematics by communicating the theory of the hyperbolic angle and hyperbolic functions, first in a course at the University of London and then in a published book.

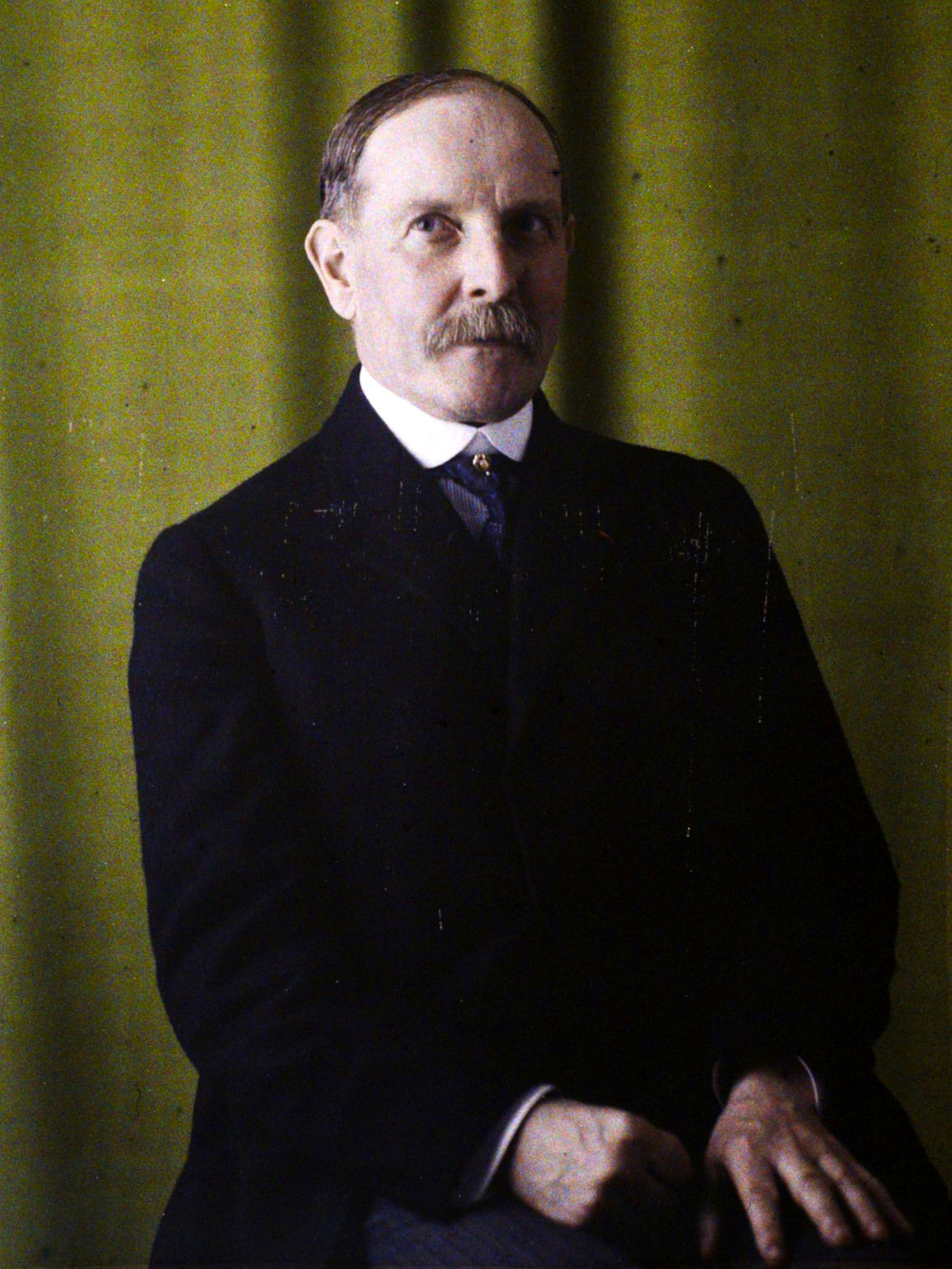
Autochrome portrait by Auguste Léon, 1922

Kennelly was an active participant in professional organizations such as the Society for the Promotion of the Metric System of Weights and Measures, the Illuminating Engineering Society and the US National Committee of the International Electrotechnical Commission, and also served as the president of both the AIEE and the Institute of Radio Engineers (IRE) during 1898–1900 and 1916, respectively. He was an Invited Speaker of the International Congress of Mathematicians in 1924 in Toronto.

While Kennelly himself does not appear to have been a significant athlete, he applied his engineering expertise to his avocation: analyzing endurance sports records of horses and humans. He noticed that time vs. distance plots of such sports records formed nearly a straight line when plotted on log-log graph paper. Kennelly thus preceded by 75 years Peter Riegel, who also—apparently independently—noticed this same power law, called by Riegel the "endurance equation". Due to the relatively crude (by today's standards) data available, Kennelly's "Law of Fatigue" utilized the same exponent 9/8 = 1.125 for all of his datasets, whereas Riegel noticed that these exponents differed by sport and by individual.

Kennelly died on June 18, 1939, in Boston, Massachusetts, at the age of 77.

== Recognition ==
=== Memberships ===
Year	Organization	Type	Ref.
1896	American Philosophical Society	Member	
1905	American Academy of Arts and Sciences	Member	
1921	National Academy of Sciences	Member	

=== Awards ===
Year	Organization	Award	Citation	Ref.
1918	Franklin Institute	Howard N. Potts Medal	—	
1932	Institute of Radio Engineers	IRE Medal of Honor	"For his studies of radio propagation phenomena and his contributions to the theory and measurement methods in the alternating current circuit field which now have extensive radio application."	
1933	American Institute of Electrical Engineers	AIEE Edison Medal	"For meritorious achievements in electrical science, electrical engineering and the electrical arts as exemplified by his contributions to the theory of electrical transmission and to the development of international electrical standards."	

== Works ==
- See Edwin Houston for the works co-authored with him.

=== Books ===
- 1890: (with Henry David Wilkinson) Practical notes for electrical students (London: "The Electrician" Prtg. & Pub. Co.)
- 1896: (with H.D. Wilkinson) Electricity in Electro-Therapeutics via Google Books
- 1912: The application of hyperbolic functions to electrical engineering problems; being the subject of a course of lectures delivered before the University of London in May and June 1911 (London: University of London Press)
- 1913: Wireless telegraphy and wireless telephony an elementary treatise (New York: Moffat, Yard & Co.)
- 1917: Artificial Electric Lines: Their Theory, Mode of Construction and Uses (New York: McGraw-Hill)
- 1928: Vestiges of Pre-metric Weights and Measures Persisting in Metric-system Europe 1926-1927 (New York: The Macmillan Company)

=== Patents ===
- U.S. patent 479,167 — "Electric meter"
- U.S. patent 500,236 — "Electrostatic voltmeter"
