= Sondrestrom Upper Atmospheric Research Facility =

Atmospheric research facility in Greenland

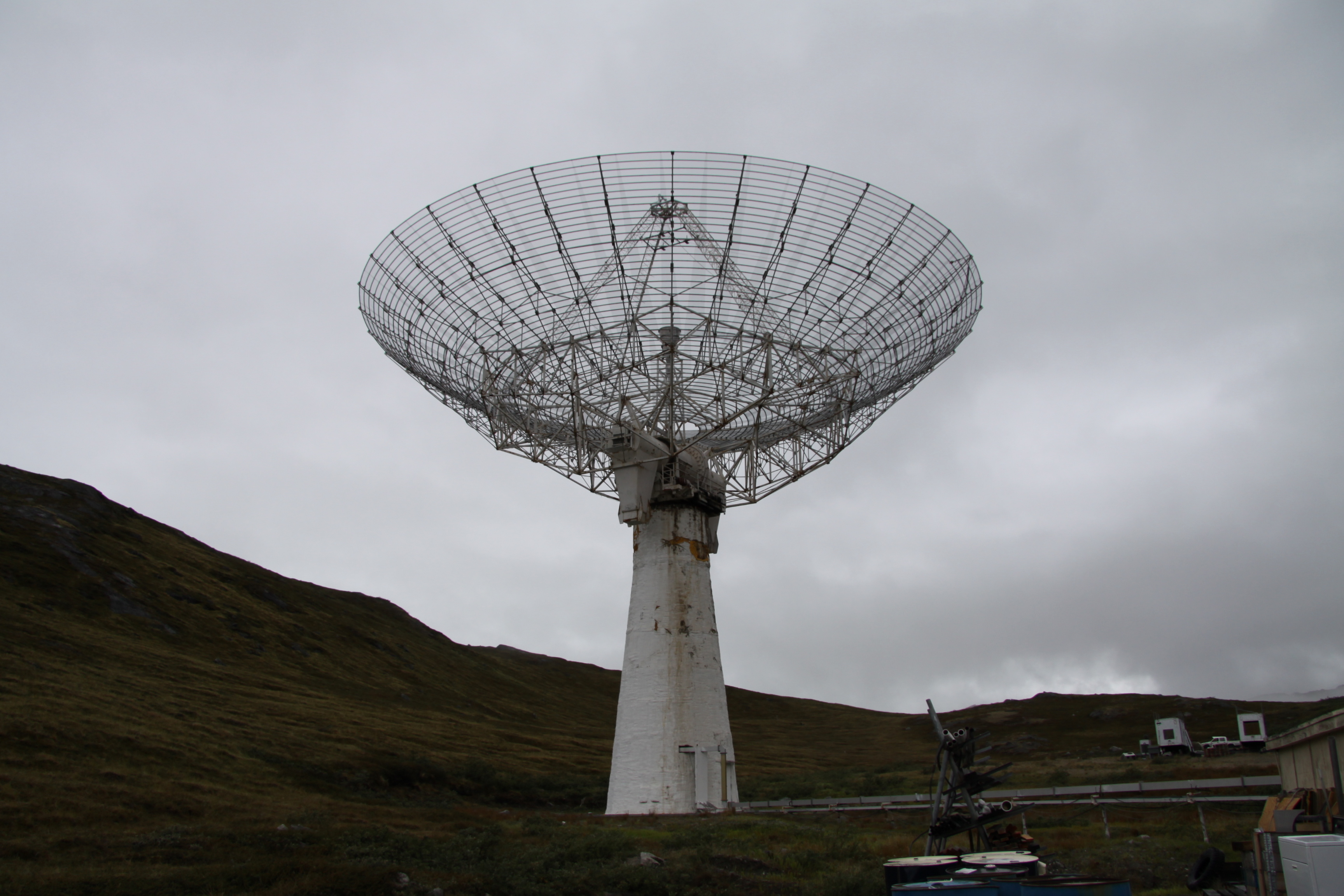
- Sondrestrom Upper Atmospheric Research Facility
- Location: Qeqqata, Greenland, Denmark
- Coordinates: 66°59′09″N 50°56′44″W
- Altitude: 196 m (643 ft)
- Wavelength: 1.4 GHz (21 cm)
- Diameter: 32 m (105 ft 0 in)
- Website: isr.sri.com
- Location within Greenland
- Related media on Commons

The Sondrestrom Upper Atmospheric Research Facility was an ionospheric and atmospheric research facility situated about 15 km (9.3 mi) west of Kangerlussuaq, Greenland. It was commonly known around the town as Kellyville. The facility was operational from 1983 to 2018. The ionospheric radar was first constructed by SRI International at Stanford, California, then moved to Chatanika, Alaska, where it was operational from November 1971 to March 1982. It was transported to Kangerlussuaq in 1983.

It was operated by SRI International for the U.S. National Science Foundation and the Danish Meteorological Institute. This facility hosted more than 20 instruments, the majority of which provided unique and complementary information about the arctic upper atmosphere. The centerpiece instrument of the facility was an L band incoherent scatter (IS) radar with a 32 m (105 ft) fully steerable antenna. The facility was closed in 2018. SRI International now runs a successor arctic IS radar called the Advanced Modular Incoherent Scatter Radar (AMISR).

The station buildings were demolished in 2023, but the dish remains in place. The University of New Brunswick plans to take over the site in 2025 and build a new ionospheric research facility.

== Gallery ==
The closed facility with boarded up windows in November 2020.

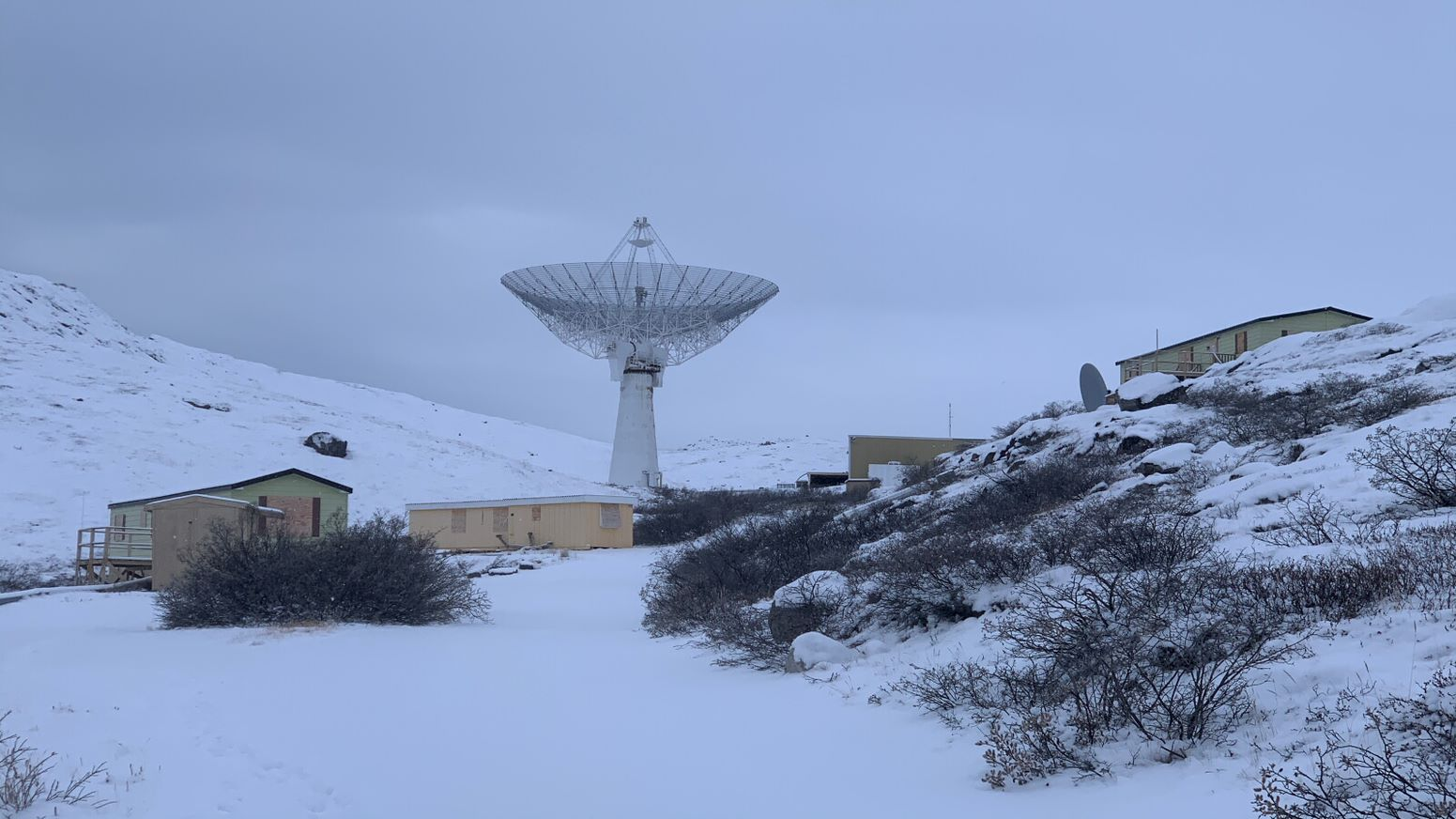

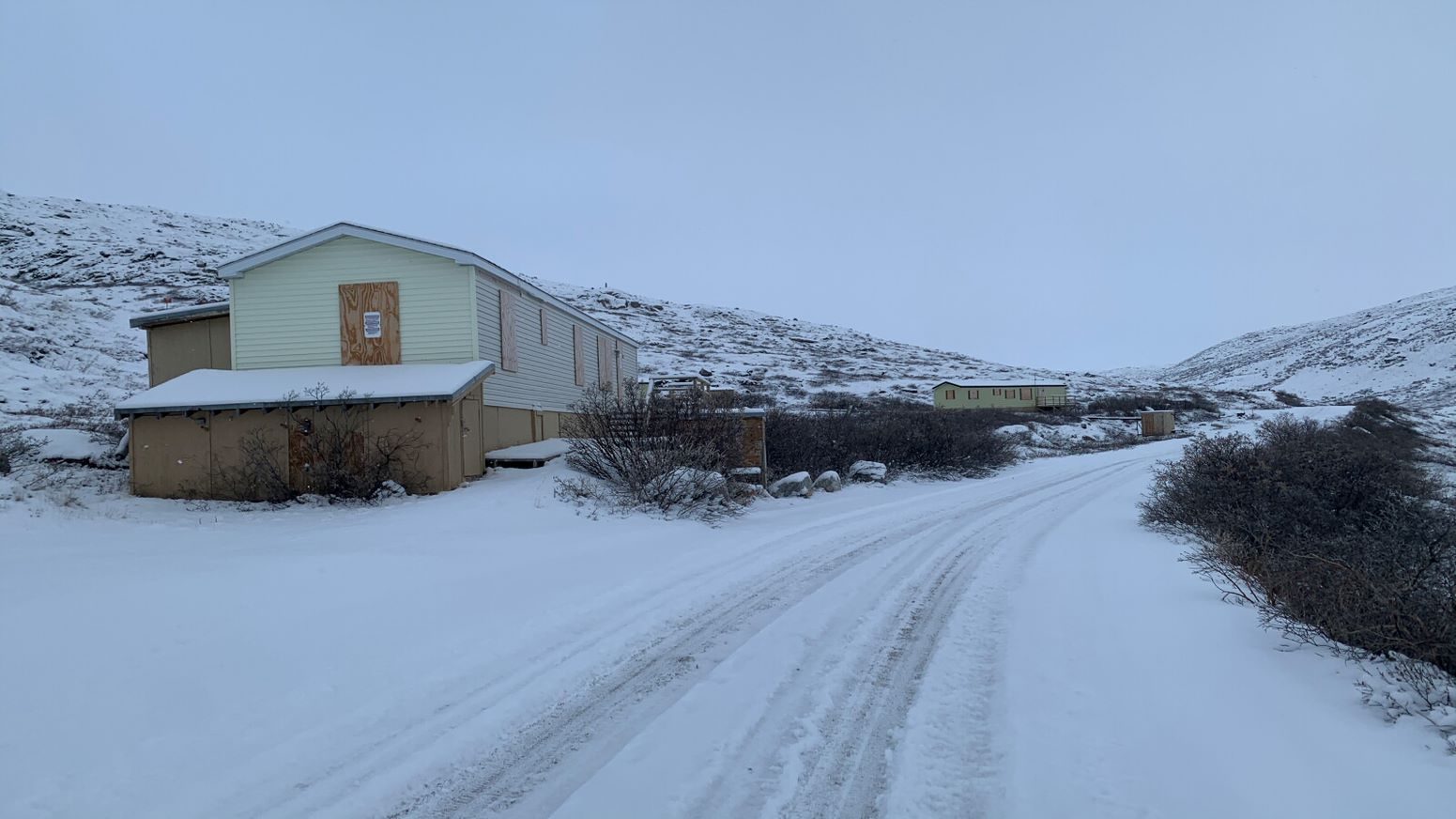

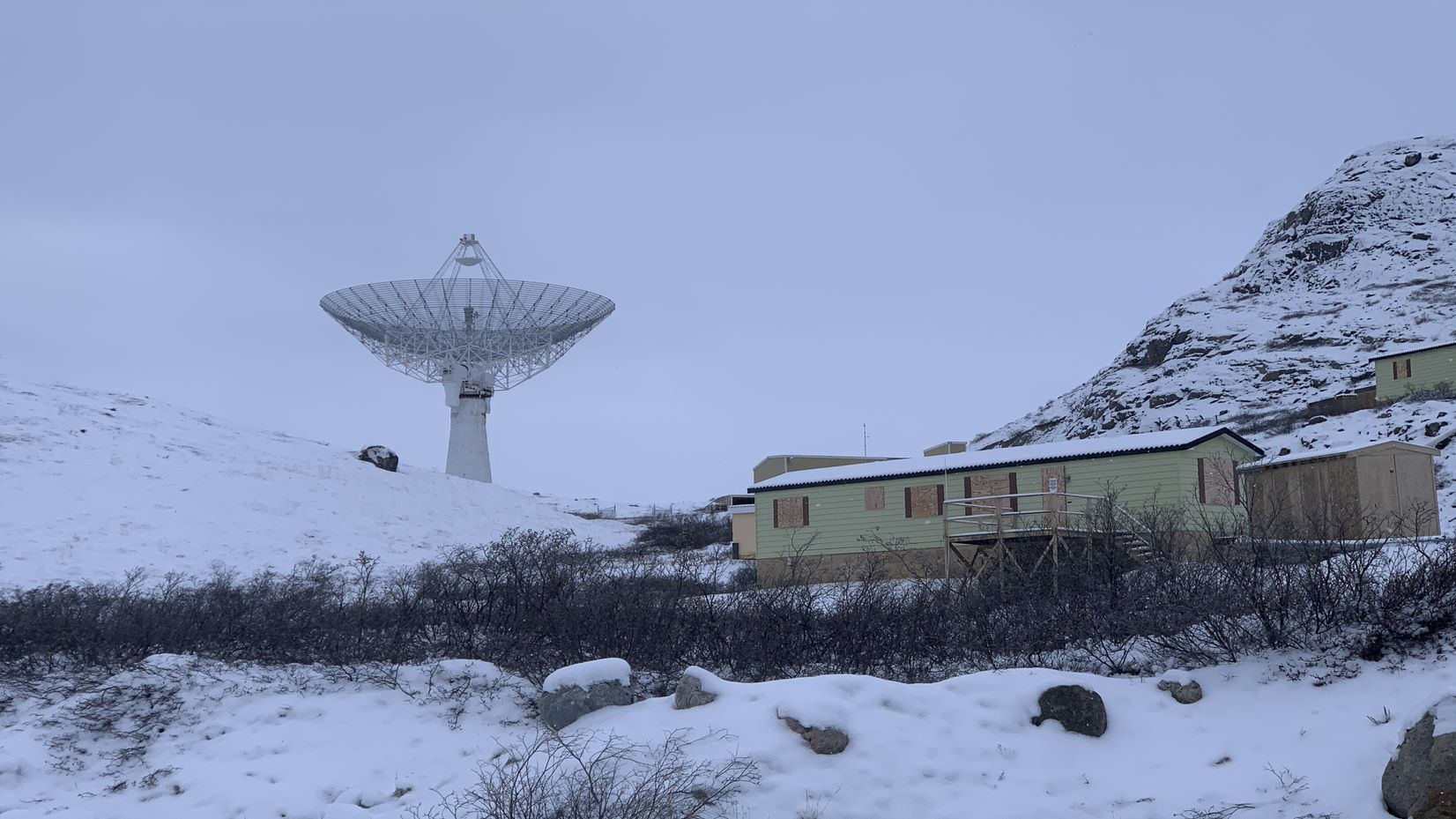

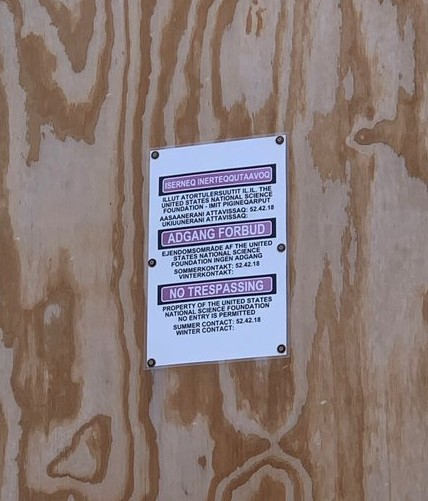
