= International Reference Ionosphere =

A sample image showing the relative magnitude of the total electron content (TEC) of the ionosphere, as calculated by the IRI 2007. Red indicates a higher electron content; blue indicates a lower electron content.

International Reference Ionosphere (IRI) is a common permanent scientific project of the Committee on Space Research (COSPAR) and the International Union of Radio Science (URSI) started 1968/69. It is the international standard empirical model for the terrestrial ionosphere since 1999. For a specified geographic location, time, and date, IRI provides average monthly values for electron density, electron temperature and ion temperature, and the molecular composition of the ions in the range of altitudes from 50 km to 2000 km. The latest standard is IRI-2012. A new version, IRI-2016, has since been released. The IRI has been extended to plasmasphere in the IRI-Plas model.

== History ==
Karl Rawer, the first chairman of the URSI/COSPAR Task group on the IRI (1968–84) specified as goal of the IRI to establish a (monthly) average model of the terrestrial ionosphere based on reliably-measured data obtained with ground- and space-based methods. Contradictions between these had to be resolved in critical discussions. After a decade filled with data collection, a first set of tables was given out in 1978. Computer source code in ALGOL and Fortran followed. In 1986, the code became available on floppy disk, and later on the Web. It is improved yearly according to the results obtained at the meetings of the task group, which often occur at COSPAR meetings. Since 1999, IRI has been the "International Standard" for the terrestrial ionosphere.

== Contents ==
IRI used (and still has an option to use) an ITU-R-model that had been developed in respect to radio propagation via the ionosphere, specifying two parameters of which one is narrowly related to the peak electron density and the other to the peak altitude of the ionosphere. Both have been and are regularly determined from ionograms at all ionospheric sounding stations. The authors R. M. Gallet and W. B. Jones had analyzed a wealth of such data from around the world by a method combining Fourier analysis in time with worldwide Legendre analysis of the Fourier coefficients. Meanwhile, regional models are often applied because they reach better local performance.

The IRI model specifies monthly averages of electron density, electron and ion temperature, and the relative percentage of several different positive ions (O+, H+, He+, N+, NO+, O2+, and Cluster ions). The model can represent variation of these quantities with altitude, latitude, longitude, date, and time of day. It can also make use of solar, ionospheric and geomagnetic indices to refine the model. Vertical total electron content (TEC) may be derived. (A snapshot of model predictions is shown in the latitude vs. longitude map above).

== Literature ==
- Bilitza, Dieter; "35 years of International Reference Ionosphere...", Advances in Radio Science, 2, 2004, pp. 283–287
- Hernández-Pajares, Manuel; Juan-Zornoza, José Miguel; Sanz Subirana, Jaume; Bilitza, Dieter; "Combining GPS measurements and IRI model values for Space weather specification", Advances in Space Research, 29:6, 2002, pp. 949–958, doi 10.1016/S0273-1177(02)00051-0
- Rawer, Karl; Ramakrishnan, Sehadri; Bilitza, Dieter; International Reference Ionosphere 1978, International Union of Radio Science, Brussels, 1978
- Jones, William B.; Gallet, Roger M.; "The representation of diurnal and geographic variations of ionospheric data by numerical methods", ITU Telecommunication Journal, 29, 1962, pp. 129ff
