= Hop (telecommunications) =

Step in the journey of a signal

In telecommunications, a hop is a portion of a signal's journey from source to receiver. Examples include:

1. The excursion of a radio wave from the Earth to the ionosphere and back to the Earth. The number of hops indicates the number of reflections from the ionosphere.
2. A similar excursion from an Earth station to a communications satellite to another station, counted similarly except that if the return trip is not by satellite, then it is only a half hop.

In computer networks, a hop is the step from one network segment to the next.
