= Karl Rawer =

German physicist (1913–2018)

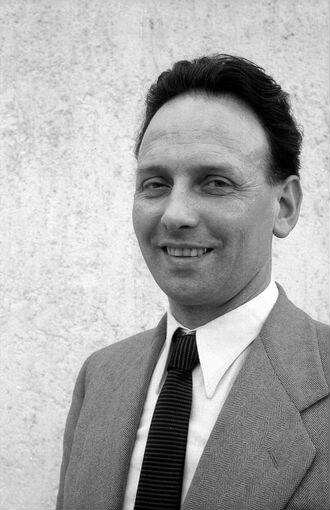
- Rawer in 1958
- Born: Karl Maria Alois Rawer; 19 April 1913; Neunkirchen, Germany
- Died: 17 April 2018 (aged 104); March, Germany
- Occupation: physicist

Karl Maria Alois Rawer (19 April 1913 – 17 April 2018) was a German specialist in radio wave propagation and the ionosphere. He developed the analytical code to determine suitable frequency ranges for short wave communication by which German forces built-up their long-distance communications during World War II.

== Biography ==
Rawer was born on 19 April 2013 in Neunkirchen, Saarland.

After studies of mathematics and physics in Freiburg and Munich (with Arnold Sommerfeld), under Jonathan Zenneck he wrote a thesis on partial reflection of radio waves in an ionospheric layer. Aware of this Johannes Plendl charged him to serve as adviser for the Shortwave communications of the German Luftwaffe, since 1943 for Navy and Army as well.

Rawer's code assumes zig-zag paths between Earth and ionosphere. Monthly predictions take account of day-to-day variations. Long term changes from solar cycles is taken account of by Wolfgang Gleißberg's prediction method.

After the war Yves Rocard, then director of French Navy research, was impressed by Rawer's code. He engaged him as "directeur scientifique" (1946–56) of his newly founded "Service de Prévision Ionosphérique".

Between 1956 and 1969, Rawer, serving in Germany as director of "Ionosphären-Institut Breisach" switched to space research. With his team he participated in the first French scientific rocket launch 1954 in the Sahara desert and later they experimented aboard rockets of different nationality.

From 1958 to 1964, he was "professeur associe" at the University of Paris. Rawer held several offices in the international space research organisation COSPAR. As director of "Fraunhofer-Institut für physikalische Weltraumforschung" (1969–79) he became the father of the two AEROS satellites, launched in 1972 and 1974.

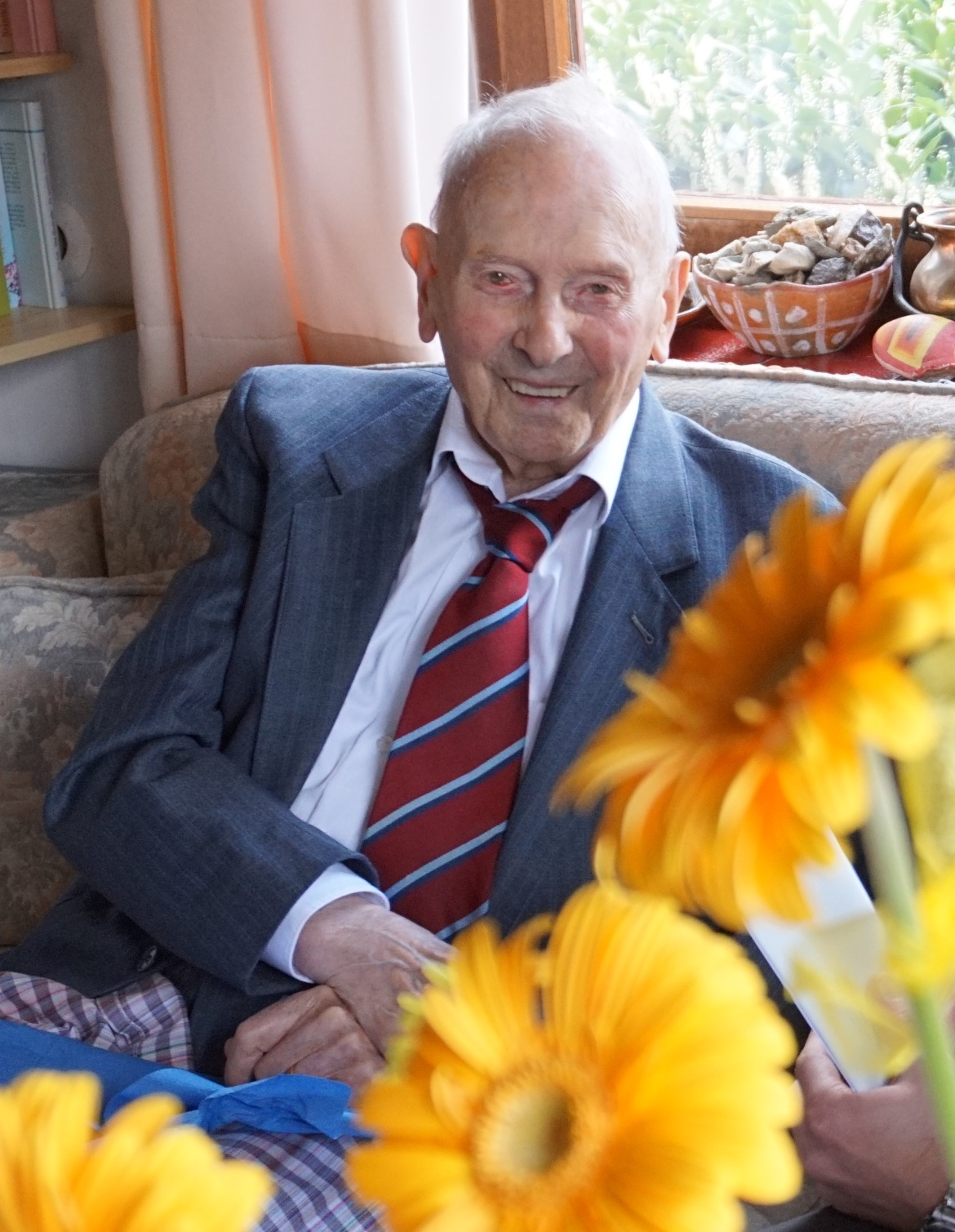
Rawer at his 104th birthday in 2017

He was actively engaged in the International Geophysical Year (gold button 2007) and follow-ups. In the International Union of Radio Science (URSI) he served with William Roy Piggott as co-author of the booklet on ionogram reduction and was vice-chairman and chairman of the ionospheric committee 1966–72. He was the father and longtime chairman of the International Reference Ionosphere that since 1999 is International Standard.

Rawer was doctor honoris causa of the University of Düsseldorf, corresponding member of the International Academy of Astronautics and of "Oesterreichische Akademie der Wissenschaften Wien". He died on 17 April 2018 in March, Breisgau, two days before his 105th birthday.

== See also ==
- List of Wikipedia people

== Sources ==
- Karl Rawer: "Meine Kinder umkreisen die Erde" (autobiography). Herder, Freiburg i. Brsg., 159 S. 1986, ISBN 3-451-08226-8
- Bodo W. Reinisch: "Karl Rawer's lfe and the history of the IRI". Adv. Space Res. 34, 1845R 2004
- Dieter Bilitza: "35 Years of International Reference Ionosphere - Karl Rawer's legacy". Adv. Radio Sci. 2, 283, 2004
