= Jack Belrose =

Canadian radio scientist (1926–2024)

John Skelton Belrose (24 November 1926 – 19 September 2024) was a Canadian radio scientist.

== Life and career ==
Belrose was born in the small town of Warner, Alberta on 24 November 1926. He attended the University of Cambridge, where he was awarded a PhD in 1958. He worked for the Defence Research Telecommunications Establishment (DRTE) for 33 years. He was a member of the Canadian Amateur Radio Hall of Fame and, along with Walter Cronkite, was awarded the Radio Club of America's Armstrong Medal on 16 November 2007. Belrose died on 19 September 2024, at the age of 97.
