= Protonosphere =

Planetary atmospheric layer

The protonosphere is a layer of the Earth's atmosphere (or any planet with a similar atmosphere) where the dominant components are atomic hydrogen and ionic hydrogen (protons). It is the outer part of the ionosphere, and extends to the interplanetary medium. Hydrogen dominates in the outermost layers because it is the lightest gas, and in the heterosphere, mixing is not strong enough to overcome differences in constituent gas densities. Charged particles are created by incoming ionizing radiation, mostly from solar radiation.

== See also ==
- Exosphere, the outer layer of a planet's atmosphere
