= Peter Riegel =

American research engineer

Peter S. Riegel
- Born: January 30, 1935
- Died: May 28, 2018 (aged 83); Columbus, Ohio, U.S.
- Education: BS Mech Eng, Purdue, 1959; MME, Villanova, 1966
- Occupation: Research engineer
- Known for: Race time prediction formula, running course certification.

Peter Riegel (January 30, 1935 – May 28, 2018) was an American research engineer who developed a mathematical formula for predicting race times for runners and other athletes given a certain performance at another distance. The formula has been widely adopted on account of its simplicity and predictive accuracy.

== Life and career ==
Riegel earned a BS in mechanical engineering from Purdue University in 1959 and his master's degree from Villanova University in 1966.

Riegel was a research engineer at Battelle Memorial Institute in Columbus, Ohio, researching the development of deep-sea diving equipment as well as air flow in coal mines. He published numerous articles on waste-water treatment, underwater life support, motorcycle mechanics and distance running.

Riegel founded and edited Measurement News, the newsletter of the Road Running Technical Council of USA Track & Field. He helped in the creation of the RRTC when USATF was first being organized, and served as its chairman until 2002. He headed the US team to design and measure the marathon courses for the 1984 and 1996 U.S. Olympics, as well as the U.S. Men's Olympic Marathon Trials race held in Columbus in 1992. He was also a founding member of the Association of Road Racing Statisticians.

Riegel held a patent for an automatic trip fill nozzle and another for an exhaust regulator valve for a push-pull diving system.

== Race time prediction ==
In a 1977 article for Runner's World Magazine, Riegel proposed a simple formula for comparing relative performances at different distances. The formula is most commonly quoted as:
$$T_{2} = T_{1} \left( \frac{D_{2}}{D_1} \right)^{1.06}$$
where:

- $T_{1}$ is the time achieved for $D_{1}$
- $T_{2}$ is the time predicted for $D_{2}$
- $D_{1}$ is the distance over which the initial time is achieved
- $D_{2}$ is the distance for which the time is to be predicted

Riegel expanded on his thesis in a 1981 article for American Scientist, stating that the formula $t = a x^{b}$ concerns activities in the "endurance range", namely lasting between 3.5 and 230 minutes. The analysis deals with running, swimming and walking.

The simplicity of the formula and its predictive accuracy has resulted in it being adopted widely by websites such as Runner's World. Some sites have modified it, stating that the value of 1.06 given for the exponent b in the formula results in seemingly unachievable predictions for longer distances.

== Publications ==
- Riegel, Peter (1971). Summary Report on Development and Construction of an Improved Line Stopper: To American Gas Association, Inc. Battelle Memorial Institute, Columbus Laboratories.
- Riegel, Peter (1972). Improvements to the Control Block of the Mark VI Mod 2 SCUBA. Defense Technical Information Center.
- Riegel, Peter (1977). Divers Heating Hose Comparison Study. Defense Technical Information Center.
- Riegel, Peter (1981). Investigation of Methods of Inspired Gas Heating. Defense Technical Information Center.
- Riegel, Peter (1982). Development of a Hydrogen-Fueled Diver Heater. Defense Technical Information Center.

== Death ==
Riegel died in Columbus on May 28, 2018, at the age of 83.
