= Incoherent scatter radar =

Scattering phenomenon in physics

Incoherent scatter radar is a ground-based radar technique for studying the Earth's ionosphere, first proposed by Professor William E. Gordon in 1958. It is based on radio waves being scattered incoherently by random fluctuations in a plasma.

A radar beam scattering off electrons in the ionosphere creates an incoherent scatter return. When an electromagnetic wave is transmitted through the atmosphere, each of the electrons in the ionospheric plasma essentially acts as an antenna excited by the incoming wave, and the wave is re-radiated from the electron. Since the electrons are all moving at varying speeds as a result of ionospheric dynamics and random thermal motion, the reflection from each electron is also Doppler shifted. The receiver on the ground then receives a signal composed of the superposition of the re-radiated waves from all the electrons in the path of the incoming wave. Since the positively-charged ions also present in the ionosphere are orders of magnitude more massive, they are not as readily excited by the incoming electromagnetic wave in the way that the electrons are, so they do not re-radiate the signal. However, the electrons tend to remain close to the positively-charged ions. As a result, the distribution function of the ionospheric electrons is modified by the much slower and more massive positive ions — electron density fluctuations relate to ion temperature, mass distribution, and motion. The incoherent scatter signal allows measurement of electron density, ion temperature and electron temperatures, ion composition and plasma velocity.

== Types of incoherent scatter radar observations ==
=== Electron density ===
If there is a greater amount of electrons present in the ionosphere, then there will be more individually reflected electromagnetic waves which reach the receiver, corresponding to greater intensity of the echo at the receiver. Since the amount of energy reflected by an individual electron is known, the receiver can use the total intensity measured to determine the electron density in the selected region.

=== Ion and electron temperature ===
Since each of the individual electrons and ions exhibits random thermal motion, the received echo will not be at the exact frequency it was transmitted. Instead, the signal will be composed of a range of frequencies near the original frequency, since it is the superposition of many individual Doppler-shifted reflections. The width of the range corresponds then to the temperature of the ionosphere. A higher temperature results in greater thermal velocity, which results in a larger Doppler shift and greater distribution in received frequency. However, the thermal behavior differs between electrons and ions. The ions are orders of magnitude more massive, and they do not interact with radiated heat in the same way that electrons do. As a result, the electron temperature and the ion temperature differ.

=== Ion drift ===
If the ionospheric plasma is in motion as a whole, then there will also be an overall Doppler shift in the received data as well. This can be seen as a shift in the mean frequency, which reveals the overall ion drift in the ionosphere.

== See also ==
- Ionosonde
- EISCAT
- Millstone Hill Observatory
- Arecibo Observatory
- Jicamarca Radio Observatory
- Sondrestrom Upper Atmospheric Research Facility
- Poker Flat Research Range
