= Ionosphere =

Ionized part of Earth's upper atmosphere

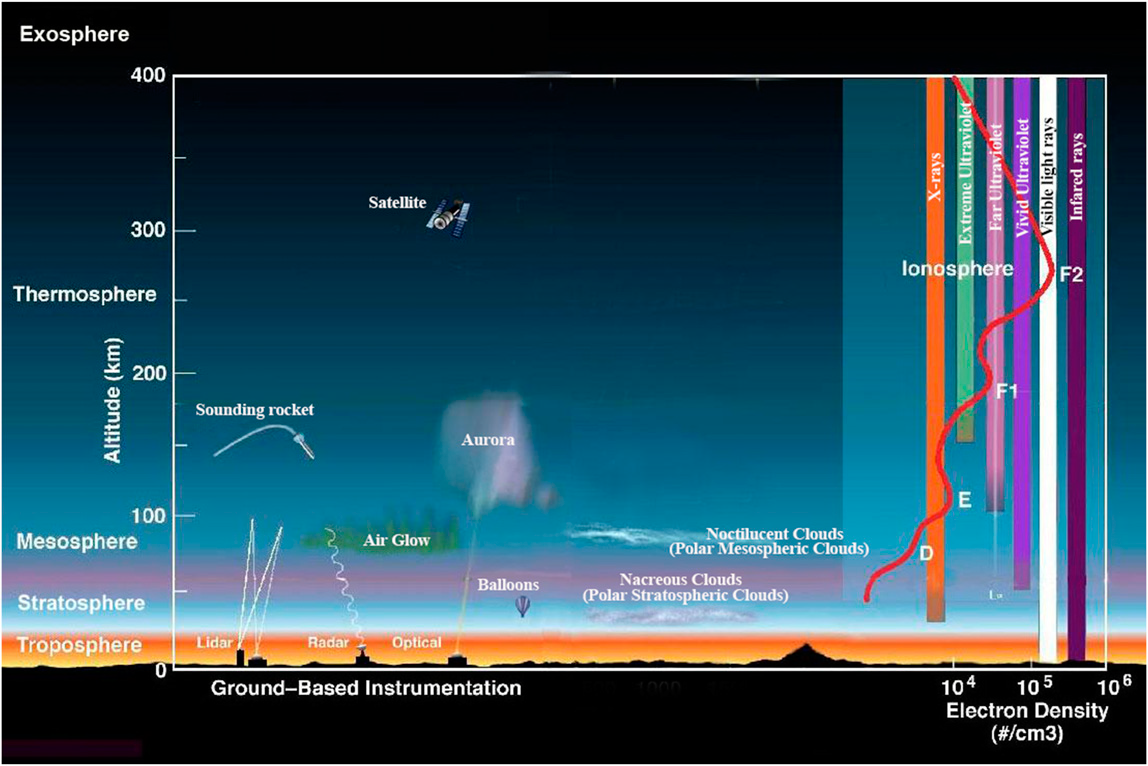
Relationship of the atmosphere and ionosphere

The ionosphere (/aɪˈɒnəˌsfɪər/) is the ionized part of the upper atmosphere of Earth, from about 48 km (30 mi) to 965 km (600 mi) above sea level, a region that includes the thermosphere and parts of the mesosphere and exosphere. The ionosphere is ionized by solar radiation. It plays an important role in atmospheric electricity and forms the inner edge of the magnetosphere. It has practical importance because, among other functions, it influences radio propagation to distant places on Earth. Travel through this layer also affects GPS signals, deflecting their paths and delaying their arrival.

== History of discovery ==
As early as 1839, the German mathematician and physicist Carl Friedrich Gauss postulated that an electrically conducting region of the atmosphere could account for observed variations of Earth's magnetic field. Sixty years later, Guglielmo Marconi received the first trans-Atlantic radio signal on December 12, 1901, in St. John's, Newfoundland (now in Canada) using a 152.4 m (500 ft) kite-supported antenna for reception. The transmitting station in Poldhu, Cornwall, used a spark-gap transmitter to produce a signal with a frequency of approximately 500 kHz and a power of 100 times more than any radio signal previously produced. The message received was three dits, the Morse code for the letter S. To reach Newfoundland the signal would have to bounce off the ionosphere twice. Dr. Jack Belrose has contested this, however, based on theoretical and experimental work. However, Marconi did achieve transatlantic wireless communications in Glace Bay, Nova Scotia, one year later.

In 1902, Oliver Heaviside proposed the existence of the Kennelly–Heaviside layer of the ionosphere which bears his name. Heaviside's proposal included means by which radio signals are transmitted around the Earth's curvature. Also in 1902, Arthur Edwin Kennelly discovered some of the ionosphere's radio-electrical properties.

In 1912, the U.S. Congress imposed the Radio Act of 1912 on amateur radio operators, limiting their operations to frequencies above 1.5 MHz (wavelength 200 meters or smaller). The government thought those frequencies were useless. This led to the discovery of HF radio propagation via the ionosphere in 1923.

In 1925, observations during a solar eclipse in New York by Dr. Alfred N. Goldsmith and his team demonstrated the influence of sunlight on radio wave propagation, revealing that short waves became weak or inaudible while long waves steadied during the eclipse, thus contributing to the understanding of the ionosphere's role in radio transmission.

In 1926, Scottish physicist Robert Watson-Watt introduced the term ionosphere in a letter published only in 1969 in Nature:

We have in quite recent years seen the universal adoption of the term 'stratosphere'..and..the companion term 'troposphere'... The term 'ionosphere', for the region in which the main characteristic is large scale ionisation with considerable mean free paths, appears appropriate as an addition to this series.

In the early 1930s, test transmissions of Radio Luxembourg inadvertently provided evidence of the first radio modification of the ionosphere; HAARP ran a series of experiments in 2017 using the eponymous Luxembourg Effect.

Edward V. Appleton was awarded a Nobel Prize in 1947 for his confirmation in 1927 of the existence of the ionosphere. Lloyd Berkner first measured the height and density of the ionosphere. This permitted the first complete theory of short-wave radio propagation. Maurice V. Wilkes and J. A. Ratcliffe researched the topic of radio propagation of very long radio waves in the ionosphere. Vitaly Ginzburg has developed a theory of electromagnetic wave propagation in plasmas such as the ionosphere.

In 1962, the Canadian satellite Alouette 1 was launched to study the ionosphere. Following its success were Alouette 2 in 1965 and the two ISIS satellites in 1969 and 1971, further AEROS-A and -B in 1972 and 1975, all for measuring the ionosphere.

On July 26, 1963, the first operational geosynchronous satellite Syncom 2 was launched. On board radio beacons on this satellite (and its successors) enabled – for the first time – the measurement of total electron content (TEC) variation along a radio beam from geostationary orbit to an earth receiver. (The rotation of the plane of polarization directly measures TEC along the path.) Australian geophysicist Elizabeth Essex-Cohen from 1969 onwards was using this technique to monitor the atmosphere above Australia and Antarctica.

== Geophysics ==
The ionosphere is a shell of electrons and electrically charged atoms and molecules that surrounds the Earth, stretching from a height of about 50 km (30 mi) to more than 1,000 km (600 mi). It exists primarily due to ultraviolet radiation from the Sun.

Heaviside and Kennelly proposed atmospheric reflection as a model for long-range radio wave propagation, in which the electrically conductive earth and an upper atmospheric layer acted as a wave guide. Heaviside used his Telegrapher's equations, and the conductivity of seawater, to propose "There may possibly be a sufficiently conducting layer in the upper air. Then the guidance will be by the sea on one side and the upper layer on the other." Kennelly proposed a physical cause, calculating that at 80 kilometers air conductivity was 20 times that of seawater. This meant that radio signals propagated as cylindrical waves, and the slower energy divergence meant they could be detected at long distances. In 1919, G. N. Watson used the earth as a conducting sphere, and a spherical atmospheric reflective layer concentric to the earth, to mathematically reproduce the Austin-Cohen formula and other long-distance propagation experiments. In 1924, Joseph Larmor published a theory of ionic refraction, quantitatively showing how ionized air bent radio waves' direction of propagation.

Between 1923 and 1925, Appleton, Miles Barnett, Reginald Smith-Rose, and R.H. Barfield conducted radio sounding experiments while looking for skywaves. They established the height of an ionized Kennelly-Heaviside layer, or "E layer" for electricity, in the upper atmosphere at between 80 and 90 km. Appleton and Barnett manipulated the frequency of transmitting waves and measured the fading caused by the interference with ground waves. They noted sky waves were weak in the day when stronger solar rays made the ionized layer thicker and closer to the ground. Skywaves also dominated at longer transmitter-receiver distances but were superpositioned with ground waves at closer distances. The skywaves also did not attenuate as fast as ground waves. Smith-Rose and Barfield measured the polarization of skywaves, incident angles, and the height of the wave-deflections.

In 1925, Gregory Breit and Merle Tuve used pulse-echo, sharp periodically repetitive pulses, to measure the ionosphere height. However, their height measurements varied from 88 km to 211 km, and varied with wavelength, indicating the ionosphere was not a sharp reflective surface, but behaved according to Larmor's ionic refraction theory. In 1927, Appleton's frequency change experiments established the higher "F layer", which indicated Breit and Tuve measurements corresponded to the bottom of the E layer and the top of the F layer. Since the E layer electron density was lower than the F layer, it refracted the longer waves more. Appleton then proposed longer wavelengths could sound the E layer, while shorted wavelengths could sound the F layer. Appleton also showed solar radiation generated the most ions around noon, pushing the F layer lower, while low ion generation at midnight raised it higher.

In the lowest part of the Earth's atmosphere, the troposphere, the temperature decreases at 10 degrees K per kilometer. The troposphere extends from the surface to about 10 km (6 mi) to 12 km (7 mi) at the tropopause. Above that is the stratosphere, where temperature increases with height until a maximum is reached at 50 kilometers, caused by the absorption of ultraviolet radiation in the ozone layer, the stratopause. Then temperature decreases in the mesosphere until it reaches a minimum of about 180 K at 80 km (50 mi) to 85 km (53 mi), the mesopause. In the thermosphere, the temperature gradient is positive until it reaches a constant of about 1000 K. At 100 kilometers is the turbopause, above which gases separate by gaseous diffusion into the heliosphere and protonosphere. Above 600 kilometers, at the exosphere, atoms can escape the Earth's gravitational pull. The ionosphere is the ionized region of the atmosphere, important for radio propagation, and the magnetosphere is where the geomagnetic field controls particle motion.

Molecular and atomic oxygen are in equal concentrations at an altitude of 125 kilometers. Above that height, atomic oxygen increases markedly due to the dissociation of molecular oxygen from 102.7 nm to 175.9 nm ultraviolet radiation. Ionization of N_{2}, O_{2} and O in the formation of the ionosphere is due to 17 nm to 175 nm extreme ultraviolet and 0.1 to 17 nm X-ray solar radiation. Radiative recombination and dissociative recombination occur with the absorption of an electron. The latter molecular process results in a 10^{5} faster loss of electrons and ions.

According to Hunsucker and Hargreaves, "The maxima of the E, F1, and F2 layers depend on the number of sunspots, R. The varying activity of the Sun over a period of about 11 years, measured in terms of the number of sunspots visible on the disk, the rate at which flares occur, or the intensity of the 10-cm radio flux, also affects the ionosphere because of variations in the intensity of the ionizing radiations in the X-ray and EUV bands." The F2 layer also exhibits anomalies due to diurnal variation and seasonal variation. Additionally, the F2 layer at mid-latitudes does not disappear at night.

Sydney Chapman proposed that the region below the ionosphere be called neutrosphere (the neutral atmosphere).

Frequencies between 30 MHz to 10 GHZ use line of sight propagation, though ionoscatter can be used for 30 to 150 MHz, troposcatter from 200 MHZ to 19 GHz, and meteor scatter from about 40 to 150 Mhz. Frequencies between 2-30 MHz are propagated by skywaves day or night. Frequencies between about 300 kHZ to 3 MHz are propagated as groundwaves day or night, and augmented as skywaves at night.

== Layers of ionization ==
Ionospheric layers

At night the F layer is the only layer of significant ionization present, while the ionization in the E and D layers is extremely low. During the day, the D and E layers become much more heavily ionized, as does the F layer, which develops an additional, weaker region of ionization known as the F_{1} layer. The F_{2} layer persists by day and night and is the main region responsible for the refraction and reflection of radio waves.

Molecular ions have a 1000 time higher recombination rate, dissociative recombination, than atomic ions, radiative recombination, reducing their concentration at night. Enhanced plasma densities at low altitudes occur in sharp layers when Fe^{+} and Mg^{+} are deposited by meteors. Ion and electron densities increase markedly above 100 km due to less atmospheric mixing and lower recombination rates.

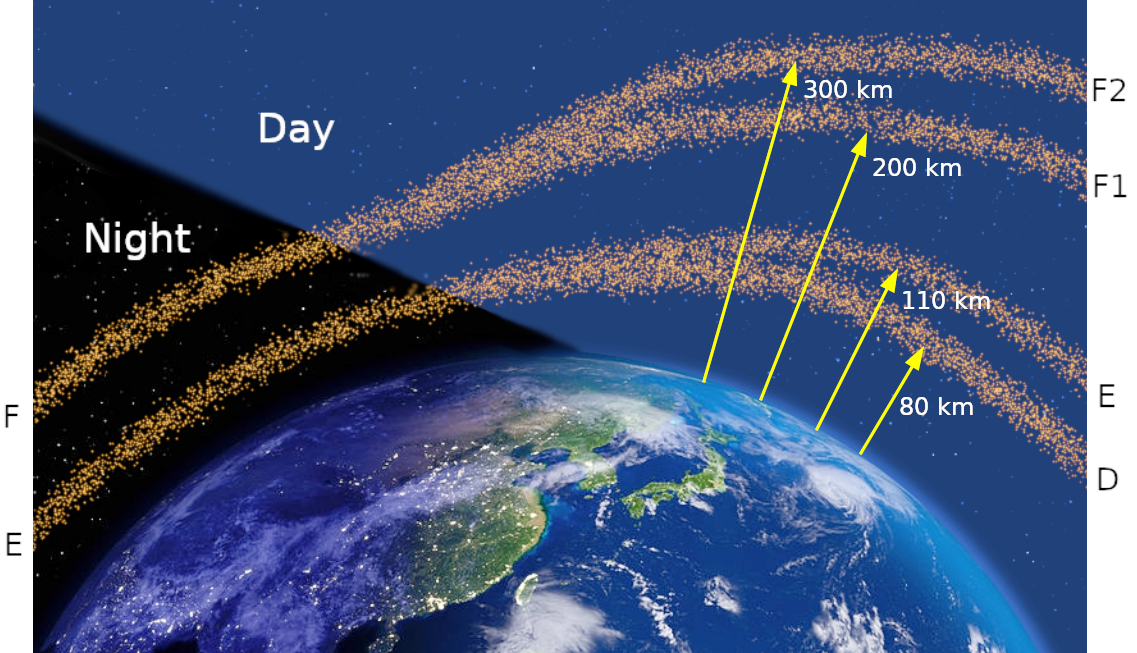
Ionospheric sub-layers from night to day indicating their approximate altitudes

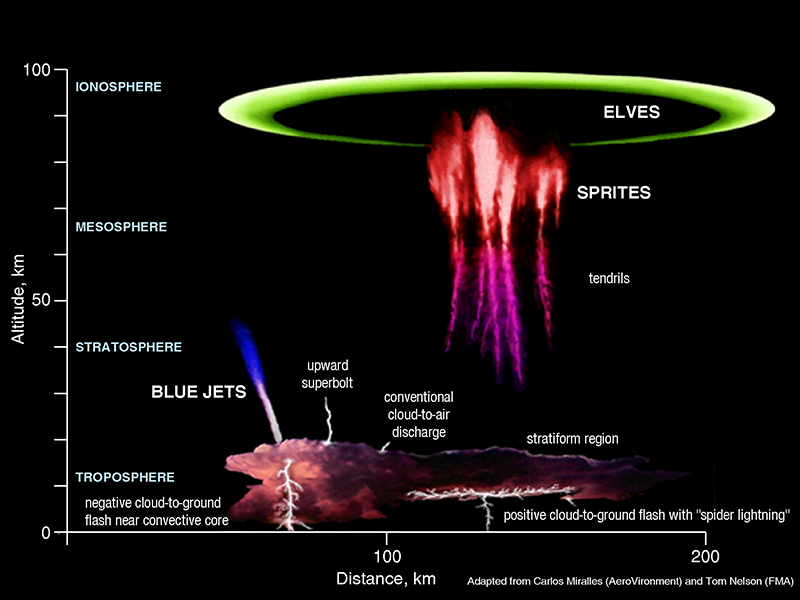
Lightning sprites

=== D layer ===
The D layer is the innermost layer, 60 to 90 km (37 to 56 mi) above the surface of the Earth with an electron density of 10^{2} to 10^{4} per cm^{-3}. Ionization here is due to Lyman series-alpha hydrogen radiation at a wavelength of 121.6 nanometre (nm) ionizing nitric oxide (NO). In addition, solar flares can generate hard X-rays (wavelength < 1 nm) that ionize N_{2} and O_{2}.

Low frequency radio waves are attenuated by the inverse square of the frequency within the D layer, as they cause free electrons to vibrate, dissipating their energy. This prevents low frequency radio signals from penetrating into the upper atmosphere, except when the D layer disappears such as at night. Ionospheric absorption results in signals below 50 MHz being less effective during peak sunspot cycles, due to enhanced ultraviolet radiation generation.

During solar proton events, ionization can reach unusually high levels in the D-region over high and polar latitudes. Such very rare events are known as Polar Cap Absorption (PCA) events, because the increased ionization significantly enhances the absorption of radio signals passing through the region. Polar radio blackouts can cover a large region, and though less frequent than auroral events, can last days.

=== E layer ===
Air density is lower in the E and F layers, causing fewer electron collisions. Instead, as the radio signals propagate upward they encounter increased electron density causing the radio signals to refract away from the increased density until they are bent back towards the Earth, essentially being reflected. Both angle of incidence and frequency determine the amount of refraction, with refraction decreasing with increasing frequency. Higher frequency radio signals may pass through the D layer, but be reflected by the E layer, or the F layers at even higher frequencies, though a frequency may be reached where the signal passes all layers into outer space.

The E layer is the middle layer, 105 to 160 km (65 to 99 mi) above the surface of the Earth with an electron density several times 10^{5} per cm^{3}. Ionization is due to 80 to 103 nm ultraviolet (UV) solar radiation ionization of molecular oxygen (O_{2}), and X-ray radiation from solar flares. The lowest level of ionization occurs just before sunrise, then increases with a peak at noon.

This region is also known as the Kennelly–Heaviside layer or simply the Heaviside layer. Its existence was predicted in 1902 independently and almost simultaneously by the American electrical engineer Arthur Edwin Kennelly (1861–1939) and the British physicist Oliver Heaviside (1850–1925). In 1924 its existence was detected by Edward V. Appleton and Miles Barnett.

=== E_{s} layer ===
The E_{s} layer (sporadic E-layer) is characterized by higher than normal E layer electron densities, which can support reflection of radio waves up to 100 MHz. Sporadic-E events may last for just a few minutes to many hours, and can be up to 2 km thick and hundreds of km long. They are common during the day in the low latitude equatorial region. They occur in the mid-latitudes more often during the day in the summer, and may be associated with metallic ion meteoric debris.

Sporadic E propagation makes VHF-operating by radio amateurs very exciting when long-distance propagation paths that are generally unreachable "open up" to two-way communication. The skip distances are generally around 1,640 km (1,020 mi). Distances for one hop propagation can be anywhere from 900 to 2,500 km (560 to 1,550 mi). Multi-hop propagation over 3,500 km (2,200 mi) is also common, sometimes to distances of 15,000 km (9,300 mi) or more.

=== F layer ===
Main gases of the ionosphere (about 50 km; 31 mi and above on this chart) vary considerably by altitude

The F layer includes the F1 from 160 km (99 mi) to 180 km (110 mi) with an electron density several times 10^{5} to 10^{6} per cm^{3}, due to extreme ultraviolet (UV, 20–900 nm) radiation ionizing atomic oxygen. The F1 layer merges into the F2 layer at night or during winter months at solar maximum. The F2 layer extends from 200 km (120 mi) to over 800 km (500 mi). Peak electron density occurs at 300 km during the day, several times 10^{6} per cm^{3}. Above 700 km, ionized hydrogen dominates over ionized oxygen.

From 1972 to 1975 NASA launched the AEROS and AEROS B satellites to study the F region.

== Ionospheric model ==
An ionospheric model is a mathematical description of the ionosphere as a function of location, altitude, day of year, phase of the sunspot cycle and geomagnetic activity. Geophysically, the state of the ionospheric plasma may be described by four parameters: electron density, electron and ion temperature and, since several species of ions are present, ionic composition. Radio propagation depends uniquely on electron density.

Models are usually expressed as computer programs. The model may be based on basic physics of the interactions of the ions and electrons with the neutral atmosphere and sunlight, or it may be a statistical description based on a large number of observations or a combination of physics and observations. One of the most widely used models is the International Reference Ionosphere (IRI), which is based on data and specifies the four parameters just mentioned. The IRI is an international project sponsored by the Committee on Space Research (COSPAR) and the International Union of Radio Science (URSI). The major data sources are the worldwide network of ionosondes, the powerful incoherent scatter radars (Jicamarca, Arecibo, Millstone Hill, Malvern, St Santin), the ISIS and Alouette topside sounders, and in situ instruments on several satellites and rockets. IRI is updated yearly. IRI is more accurate in describing the variation of the electron density from bottom of the ionosphere to the altitude of maximum density than in describing the total electron content (TEC). Since 1999 this model is "International Standard" for the terrestrial ionosphere (standard TS16457).

== Persistent anomalies to the idealized model ==
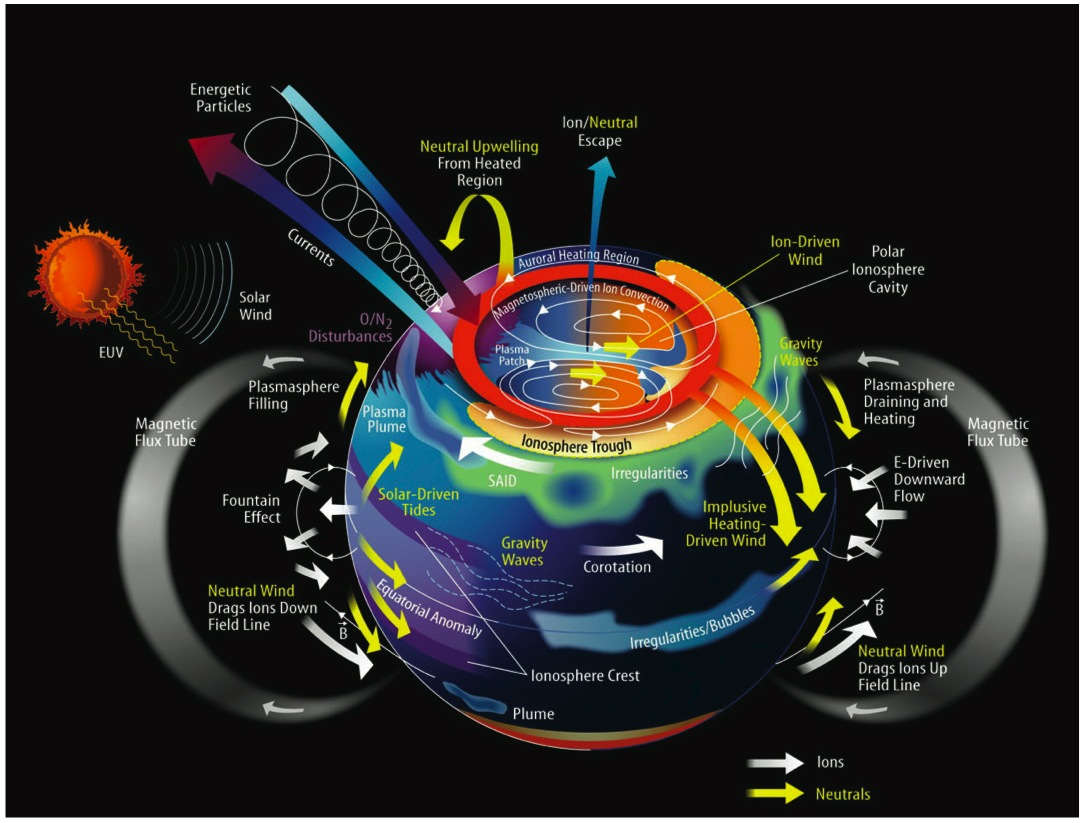
Overview of ionosphere phenomena

Ionograms allow deducing, via computation, the true shape of the different layers. Nonhomogeneous structure of the electron/ion-plasma produces rough echo traces, seen predominantly at night and at higher latitudes, and during disturbed conditions.

=== Winter anomaly ===
At mid-latitudes, the F_{2} layer daytime ion production is higher in the summer, as expected, since the Sun shines more directly on the Earth. However, there are seasonal changes in the molecular-to-atomic ratio of the neutral atmosphere that cause the summer ion loss rate to be even higher. The result is that the increase in the summertime loss overwhelms the increase in summertime production, and total F_{2} ionization is actually lower in the local summer months. This effect is known as the winter anomaly. The anomaly is always present in the northern hemisphere, but is usually absent in the southern hemisphere during periods of low solar activity.

=== Equatorial anomaly ===
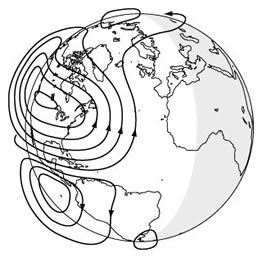
Electric currents created in sunward ionosphere.

Within approximately ± 20 degrees of the magnetic equator, is the equatorial anomaly. It is the occurrence of a trough in the ionization in the F_{2} layer at the equator and crests at about 17 degrees in magnetic latitude. The Earth's magnetic field lines are horizontal at the magnetic equator. Solar heating and tidal oscillations in the lower ionosphere move plasma up and across the magnetic field lines. This sets up a sheet of electric current in the E region which, with the horizontal magnetic field, forces ionization up into the F layer, concentrating at ± 20 degrees from the magnetic equator. This phenomenon is known as the equatorial fountain.

=== Equatorial electrojet ===
The worldwide solar-driven wind results in the so-called Sq (solar quiet) current system in the E region of the Earth's ionosphere (ionospheric dynamo region) (100–130 km (60–80 mi) altitude). Resulting from this current is an electrostatic field directed west–east (dawn–dusk) in the equatorial day side of the ionosphere. At the magnetic dip equator, where the geomagnetic field is horizontal, this electric field results in an enhanced eastward current flow within ± 3 degrees of the magnetic equator, known as the equatorial electrojet.

== Ephemeral ionospheric perturbations ==
=== X-rays: sudden ionospheric disturbances (SID) ===
When the Sun is active, strong solar flares can occur that hit the sunlit side of Earth with hard X-rays. The X-rays penetrate to the D-region, releasing electrons that rapidly increase absorption, causing a high frequency (3–30 MHz) radio blackout that can persist for many hours after strong flares. During this time very low frequency (3–30 kHz) signals will be reflected by the D layer instead of the E layer, where the increased atmospheric density will usually increase the absorption of the wave and thus dampen it. As soon as the X-rays end, the sudden ionospheric disturbance (SID) or radio black-out steadily declines as the electrons in the D-region recombine rapidly and propagation gradually returns to pre-flare conditions over minutes to hours depending on the solar flare strength and frequency.

=== Protons: polar cap absorption (PCA) ===
Associated with solar flares is a release of high-energy protons. These particles can hit the Earth within 15 minutes to 2 hours of the solar flare. The protons spiral around and down the magnetic field lines of the Earth and penetrate into the atmosphere near the magnetic poles increasing the ionization of the D and E layers. PCA's typically last anywhere from about an hour to several days, with an average of around 24 to 36 hours. Coronal mass ejections can also release energetic protons that enhance D-region absorption in the polar regions.

=== Storms ===
Geomagnetic storms and ionospheric storms are temporary and intense disturbances of the Earth's magnetosphere and ionosphere.

During a geomagnetic storm the F₂ layer will become unstable, fragment, and may even disappear completely. In the Northern and Southern polar regions of the Earth aurorae will be observable in the night sky.

=== Lightning ===
Lightning can cause ionospheric perturbations in the D-region in one of two ways. The first is through VLF (very low frequency) radio waves launched into the magnetosphere. These so-called "whistler" mode waves can interact with radiation belt particles and cause them to precipitate onto the ionosphere, adding ionization to the D-region. These disturbances are called "lightning-induced electron precipitation" (LEP) events.

Additional ionization can also occur from direct heating/ionization as a result of huge motions of charge in lightning strikes. These events are called early/fast.

In 1925, C. T. R. Wilson proposed a mechanism by which electrical discharge from lightning storms could propagate upwards from clouds to the ionosphere. Around the same time, Robert Watson-Watt, working at the Radio Research Station in Slough, UK, suggested that the ionospheric sporadic E layer (E_{s}) appeared to be enhanced as a result of lightning but that more work was needed. In 2005, C. Davis and C. Johnson, working at the Rutherford Appleton Laboratory in Oxfordshire, UK, demonstrated that the E_{s} layer was indeed enhanced as a result of lightning activity. Their subsequent research has focused on the mechanism by which this process can occur.

== Applications ==
=== Radio communication ===
Due to the ability of ionized atmospheric gases to refract high frequency (HF, or shortwave) radio waves, the ionosphere can reflect radio waves directed into the sky back toward the Earth. Radio waves directed at an angle into the sky can return to Earth beyond the horizon. This technique, called "skip" or "skywave" propagation, has been used since the 1920s to communicate at international or intercontinental distances. The returning radio waves can reflect off the Earth's surface into the sky again, allowing greater ranges to be achieved with multiple hops. This communication method is variable and unreliable, with reception over a given path depending on time of day or night, the seasons, weather, and the 11-year sunspot cycle. During the first half of the 20th century it was widely used for transoceanic telephone and telegraph service, and business and diplomatic communication. Due to its relative unreliability, shortwave radio communication has been mostly abandoned by the telecommunications industry, though it remains important for high-latitude communication where the availability of satellite-based radio communication may be insufficient. Shortwave broadcasting is useful in crossing international boundaries and covering large areas at low cost. Automated services still use shortwave radio frequencies, as do radio amateur hobbyists for private recreational contacts and to assist with emergency communications during natural disasters. Armed forces use shortwave so as to be independent of vulnerable infrastructure, including satellites, and the low latency of shortwave communications make it attractive to stock traders, where milliseconds count.

==== Mechanism of refraction ====
When a radio wave reaches the ionosphere, the electric field in the wave forces the electrons in the ionosphere into oscillation at the same frequency as the radio wave. Some of the radio-frequency energy is given up to this resonant oscillation. The oscillating electrons will then either be lost to recombination or will re-radiate the original wave energy. Total refraction can occur when the collision frequency of the ionosphere is less than the radio frequency, and if the electron density in the ionosphere is great enough.

A qualitative understanding of how an electromagnetic wave propagates through the ionosphere can be obtained by recalling geometric optics. Since the ionosphere is a plasma, it can be shown that the refractive index is less than unity. Hence, the electromagnetic "ray" is bent away from the normal rather than toward the normal as would be indicated when the refractive index is greater than unity. It can also be shown that the refractive index of a plasma, and hence the ionosphere, is frequency-dependent, see Dispersion (optics).

The critical frequency is the limiting frequency at or below which a radio wave is reflected by an ionospheric layer at vertical incidence. If the transmitted frequency is higher than the plasma frequency of the ionosphere, then the electrons cannot respond fast enough, and they are not able to re-radiate the signal. It is calculated as shown below:

$$f_{\text{critical}} = 9 \times\sqrt{N}$$

where N = electron density per m^{3} and f_{critical} is in Hz.

The Maximum Usable Frequency (MUF) is defined as the upper frequency limit that can be used for transmission between two points at a specified time.

$$f_\text{muf} = \frac{f_\text{critical}}{ \sin \alpha}$$

where $\alpha$ = angle of arrival, the angle of the wave relative to the horizon, and sin is the sine function.

The cutoff frequency is the frequency below which a radio wave fails to penetrate a layer of the ionosphere at the incidence angle required for transmission between two specified points by refraction from the layer.

=== GPS/GNSS ionospheric correction ===
There are a number of models used to understand the effects of the ionosphere on global navigation satellite systems. The Klobuchar model is currently used to compensate for ionospheric effects in GPS. This model was developed at the US Air Force Geophysical Research Laboratory circa 1974 by John (Jack) Klobuchar. The Galileo navigation system uses the NeQuick model. GALILEO broadcasts 3 coefficients to compute the effective ionization level, which is then used by the NeQuick model to compute a range delay along the line-of-sight.

=== Other applications ===
The open system electrodynamic tether, which uses the ionosphere, is being researched. The space tether uses plasma contactors and the ionosphere as parts of a circuit to extract energy from the Earth's magnetic field by electromagnetic induction.

== Measurements ==
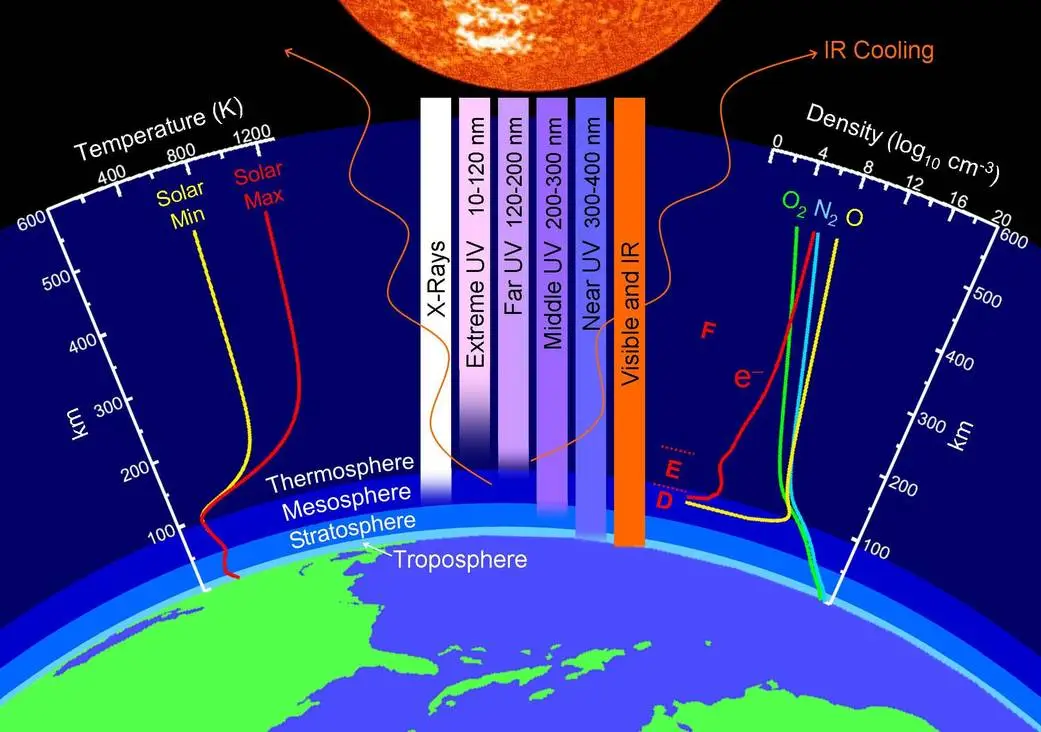
Properties of Earth's Upper Atmosphere

=== Overview ===
Scientists explore the structure of the ionosphere by a wide variety of methods. They include:

- passive observations of optical and radio emissions generated in the ionosphere
- bouncing radio waves of different frequencies from it
- incoherent scatter radars such as the EISCAT, Sondre Stromfjord, Millstone Hill, Arecibo, Advanced Modular Incoherent Scatter Radar (AMISR) and Jicamarca radars
- coherent scatter radars such as the Super Dual Auroral Radar Network (SuperDARN) radars
- special receivers to detect how the reflected waves have changed from the transmitted waves.

A variety of experiments, such as HAARP (High Frequency Active Auroral Research Program), involve high power radio transmitters to modify the properties of the ionosphere. These investigations focus on studying the properties and behavior of ionospheric plasma, with particular emphasis on being able to understand and use it to enhance communications and surveillance systems for both civilian and military purposes. HAARP was started in 1993 as a proposed twenty-year experiment, and is currently active near Gakona, Alaska.

The SuperDARN radar project researches the high- and mid-latitudes using coherent backscatter of radio waves in the 8 to 20 MHz range. Coherent backscatter is similar to Bragg scattering in crystals and involves the constructive interference of scattering from ionospheric density irregularities. The project involves more than 11 countries and multiple radars in both hemispheres.

Scientists are also examining the ionosphere by the changes to radio waves, from satellites and stars, passing through it. The Arecibo Telescope located in Puerto Rico, was originally intended to study Earth's ionosphere.

=== Ionograms ===
Ionograms are plots of virtual height of radio frequency reflection versus frequency. An ionosonde transmits an approximate range of frequencies, 0.5 to 25 MHz, as pulses or continuous wave-FM. The received signal includes transit time, frequency, amplitude, phase, polarization, Doppler shift, and spectrum shape. True height of layers, and line of sight velocity may also be derived from the measurements. An array of receiving antennas can provide information of any irregularities in the ionospheric layers.

As the frequency increases, each wave is refracted less by the ionization in the layer, and so each penetrates further before it is reflected. Eventually, a frequency is reached that enables the wave to penetrate the layer without being reflected. For ordinary mode waves, this occurs when the transmitted frequency just exceeds the peak plasma, or critical, frequency of the layer. Reduction rules are given in: "URSI Handbook of Ionogram Interpretation and Reduction", edited by William Roy Piggott and Karl Rawer, Elsevier Amsterdam, 1961 (translations into Chinese, French, Japanese and Russian are available).

=== Incoherent scatter radars ===
Incoherent scatter radars operate above the critical frequencies. Therefore, the technique allows probing the ionosphere, unlike ionosondes, also above the electron density peaks. The thermal fluctuations of the electron density scattering the transmitted signals lack coherence, which gave the technique its name. Their power spectrum contains information not only on the density, but also on the ion and electron temperatures, ion masses and drift velocities. Incoherent scatter radars can also measure neutral atmosphere movements, such as atmospheric tides, after making assumptions about ion-neutral collision frequency across the ionospheric dynamo region.

=== GNSS radio occultation ===
Radio occultation is a remote sensing technique where a GNSS signal tangentially scrapes the Earth, passing through the atmosphere, and is received by a Low Earth Orbit (LEO) satellite. As the signal passes through the atmosphere, it is refracted, curved and delayed. An LEO satellite samples the total electron content and bending angle of many such signal paths as it watches the GNSS satellite rise or set behind the Earth. Using an Inverse Abel's transform, a radial profile of refractivity at that tangent point on earth can be reconstructed.

Major GNSS radio occultation missions include the GRACE, CHAMP, and COSMIC.

== Indices of the ionosphere ==
In empirical models of the ionosphere such as Nequick, the following indices are used as indirect indicators of the state of the ionosphere.

=== Solar intensity ===
F10.7 and R12 are two indices commonly used in ionospheric modelling. Both are valuable for their long historical records covering multiple solar cycles. F10.7 is a measurement of the intensity of solar radio emissions at a frequency of 2800 MHz made using a ground radio telescope. R12 is a 12 months average of daily sunspot numbers. The two indices have been shown to be correlated with each other.

However, both indices are only indirect indicators of solar ultraviolet and X-ray emissions, which are primarily responsible for causing ionization in the Earth's upper atmosphere. We now have data from the GOES spacecraft that measures the background X-ray flux from the Sun, a parameter more closely related to the ionization levels in the ionosphere.

=== Geomagnetic disturbances ===
- The A- and K-indices are a measurement of the behavior of the horizontal component of the geomagnetic field. The K-index uses a semi-logarithmic scale from 0 to 9 to measure the strength of the horizontal component of the geomagnetic field. The Boulder K-index is measured at the Boulder Geomagnetic Observatory.
- The geomagnetic activity levels of the Earth are measured by the fluctuation of the Earth's magnetic field in SI units called teslas (or in non-SI gauss, especially in older literature). The Earth's magnetic field is measured around the planet by many observatories. The data retrieved is processed and turned into measurement indices. Daily measurements for the entire planet are made available through an estimate of the A_{p}-index, called the planetary A-index (PAI).

== Ionospheres of other planets and natural satellites ==
Objects in the Solar System that have appreciable atmospheres (i.e., all of the major planets and many of the larger natural satellites) generally produce ionospheres. Planets known to have ionospheres include Venus, Mars, Jupiter, Saturn, Uranus, and Neptune.

The atmosphere of Titan includes an ionosphere that ranges from about 880 to 1,300 km (550 to 810 mi) in altitude and contains carbon compounds. Ionospheres have also been observed at Io, Europa, Ganymede, Callisto, Triton, and Pluto.

== See also ==
- Aeronomy
- Geospace
- Space physics
- Geophysics
  - International Reference Ionosphere
  - Ionospheric dynamo region
  - Magnetospheric electric convection field
  - Protonosphere
  - Schumann resonances
  - Van Allen radiation belt
- Radio
  - Earth–ionosphere waveguide
  - Fading
  - Ionospheric absorption
  - Ionospheric scintillation
  - Line-of-sight propagation
  - Sferics
- Related
  - Canadian Geospace Monitoring
  - High Frequency Active Auroral Research Program
  - Ionospheric heater
  - S4 Index
  - Soft gamma repeater
  - Upper-atmospheric lightning
  - Sura Ionospheric Heating Facility
  - TIMED (Thermosphere Ionosphere Mesosphere Energetics and Dynamics)
