= Kennelly–Heaviside layer =

Layer of the Earth's ionosphere

Layers of the ionosphere. The Kennelly–Heaviside layer is the E region

The Heaviside layer, sometimes called the Kennelly–Heaviside layer, named after Arthur E. Kennelly and Oliver Heaviside, is a layer of ionised gas occurring roughly between 90 and 150 km (56 and 93 mi) above the ground — one of several layers in the Earth's ionosphere. It is also known as the E region. It reflects medium-frequency radio waves. Because of this reflective layer, radio waves radiated into the sky can return to Earth beyond the horizon. This "skywave" or "skip" propagation technique has been used since the 1920s for radio communication at long distances, up to transcontinental distances.

Propagation is affected by the time of day. During the daytime the solar radiation presses this layer closer to the Earth, thereby limiting how far it can reflect radio waves. Conversely, on the night (lee) side of the Earth, the solar wind drags the ionosphere further away, thereby greatly increasing the range which radio waves can travel by reflection. The extent of the effect is further influenced by the season, and the amount of sunspot activity.

== History ==
Existence of a reflective layer was predicted in 1902 independently and almost simultaneously by the American electrical engineer Arthur Edwin Kennelly (1861–1939) and the British polymath Oliver Heaviside (1850–1925), as an explanation for the propagation of radio waves beyond the horizon observed by Guglielmo Marconi in 1901. However, it was not until 1924 that its existence was shown by British scientist Edward V. Appleton, for which he received the 1947 Nobel Prize in Physics.

Physicists resisted the idea of the reflecting layer for one very good reason; it would require total internal reflection, which in turn would require that the speed of light in the ionosphere would be greater than in the atmosphere below it. Since the latter speed is essentially the same as the speed of light in vacuum (c), scientists were unwilling to believe the speed in the ionosphere could be higher. Nevertheless, Marconi had received signals in Newfoundland that were broadcast in England, so clearly there must be some mechanism allowing the transmission to reach that far. The paradox was resolved by the discovery that there were two velocities of light, the phase velocity and the group velocity. The phase velocity can in fact be greater than c, but the group velocity, being capable of transmitting information, cannot, by special relativity, be greater than c. The phase velocity for radio waves in the ionosphere is indeed greater than c, and that makes total internal reflection possible, and so the ionosphere can reflect radio waves. The geometric mean of the phase velocity and the group velocity cannot exceed c, so when the phase velocity goes above c, the group velocity must go below it.

In 1925, Americans Gregory Breit and Merle A. Tuve first mapped the Heaviside layer's variations in altitude. The ITU standard model of absorption and reflection of radio waves by the Heaviside Layer was developed by the British Ionospheric physicist Louis Muggleton in the 1970s.

== Etymology ==
Around 1910, William Eccles proposed the name "Heaviside Layer" for the radio-wave reflecting layer in the upper atmosphere, and the name has subsequently been widely adopted. The name Kennelly–Heaviside layer was proposed in 1925 to give credit to the work of Kennelly, which predated the proposal by Heaviside by several months.

== See also ==
- Van Allen Belt
