= Glenn Edmond Shaw =

American scientist

- Born: 1938 (age 87–88)
- Education: Ph.D., University of Arizona, 1971
- Employer(s): Geophysical Institute, University of Alaska Fairbanks
- Known for: Sun photometry, aerosol properties and transport, climate change

Glenn Edmond Shaw is an American scientist specializing in atmospheric physics, especially relating to global climate change and long-range transport of aerosol material. He is Emeritus Professor of Physics and Atmospheric Science at the University of Alaska Fairbanks and a member of the scientific staff of the Geophysical Institute. He conducted research on global atmospheric transport of aerosols and feedback of biogenic aerosols on global climate. He and Kenneth Rahn did research on the sources and climatic effect of Arctic haze. He did pioneering work on the scientific concept of climate homeostasis through the sulfur cycle and atmospheric aerosol.

== Life ==
Glenn Edmond Shaw was born in Butte, Montana on December 5, 1938. He married Gladys Roberta Culver in 1957 in Butte, Montana. They have five children. He served in the US Navy on the USS Bon Homme Richard (CV-31) during 1957-1959. Highlights of his life and career are recounted in the autobiography "Fingerprints on the Moon."

== Education ==
Shaw received a BS in 1963 from Montana State University, a MS in 1965 from University of Southern California, and a PhD in 1971 from University of Arizona. His PhD advisors were Benjamin S. Herman and John A. Reagan, and his dissertation was "An experimental study of atmospheric turbidity using radiometric techniques."

== Professional Activities ==
- Howard Hughes Fellowship, 1963-1965
- Professor, University of Alaska 1971-2010
- Sabbatical at World Radiation Center, Davos Switzerland sponsored by [Claus Fröhlich] (1977)
- Convenor of International Conference on Arctic Air Pollution, Cambridge England (September 1985)
- Convenor of Chapman Conference on the Gaia Hypothesis, San Diego, CA (1988)
- Sabbatical at University of Vienna, Vienna, Austria sponsored by Othmar Preining (1995)
- Member Polar Research Board of the National Academy of Sciences (1995-1999)
- Trustee, University Corporation for Atmospheric Research (1995-1999)

== Research ==
Shaw's work helped establish sun photometry as a precision remote measurement technique for studying atmospheric aerosols. He used this technique throughout his career to investigate aerosols in remote regions, including the Arctic, the central Pacific, and the Antarctic. Shaw, working with Kenneth Rahn and using neutron activation technique as a chemical fingerprint identified the source regions of haze that builds up in the Arctic. They found the haze was confined within the boundaries of the Arctic Front, which expands in area to a maximum in spring months. Based on sun photometry measurements made at Mauna Loa Observatory, Shaw documented global-scale transport of aerosol. Shaw measured chemical and physical properties of aerosol over the Antarctic Ice Sheet. He found little evidence of anthropogenic imprint, but did find a strong, naturally occurring, sulfate aerosol. He attributed this sulfate aerosol to the biogenic dimethyl sulfide (DMS) emission in the oceans surround the continent. He suggested that this sulfate aerosol might modulate climate, perhaps in a global feedback loop. These findings opened the way for further work on the possibility of biological regulation of climate; for example, the opening paragraph of the CLAW hypothesis paper states "However, the atmospheric aerosol also participates in the radiation balance, and Shaw has proposed that the aerosol produced by the atmospheric oxidation of sulphur gases from the biota may also affect climate." Shaw published around 200 papers during his career. Notable papers include:

=== Runaway electrons in lightning ===
- Shaw, G. E. (1967). "Cosmic count increase associated with thunderstorms". Journal of Geophysical Research (72): 4623–4626. doi:10.1029/JZ072i018p04623. Archived from the original on 2022-03-20.

=== Precision radiometry (sun photometry) ===
- Shaw, G. E.; J. A. Reagan; B. M. Herman (1973). "Investigations of atmospheric extinction using direct solar radiation measurements made with a multiple wavelength radiometer". Journal of Applied Meteorology and Climatology. 12 (12): 374–380. Bibcode:1973JApMe..12..374S. doi:10.1175/1520-0450(1973)012<0374:IOAEUD>2.0.CO;2. Archived from the original on 2022-03-20.(381 citations as of April 2022.)

=== Radiative transfer and modeling ===
- Shaw, G. E. (1973). "Observations and theoretical reconstruction of the Green Flash". Journal of Pure and Applied Geophysics. 102 (102): 223–235. Bibcode:1973PApGe.102..223S. doi:10.1007/BF00876608. S2CID 128763569. Archived from the original on 2022-03-20.
- Shaw, G. E. (1978). "Sky radiance during a total solar eclipse: a theoretical model". Applied Optics. 17 (17): 272–276. Bibcode:1978ApOpt..17..272S. doi:10.1364/AO.17.000272. PMID 20174395. Archived from the original on 2022-03-20.

=== Arctic haze and long-range transport of aerosols ===
- Rahn, K. A.; R. D. Borys; Shaw, G. E. (1977). "The Asian source of Arctic haze bands". Nature. 268 (268): 713–715. Bibcode:1977Natur.268..713R. doi:10.1038/268713a0. S2CID 4187010. Archived from the original on 2022-03-20. (219 citations as of April 2022.)
- Shaw, G. E. (1980). "Transport of Asian desert aerosol to the Hawaiian Islands". Journal of Applied Meteorology and Climatology. 19 (19): 1254–1259. Bibcode:1980JApMe..19.1254S. doi:10.1175/1520-0450(1980)019<1254:TOADAT>2.0.CO;2. Archived from the original on 2022-03-20. (271 citations as of April 2022.)

=== Cloud physics ===
- Ji, Q; Shaw, G. E.; W. Cantrell (1998). "A new instrument for measuring cloud condensation nuclei: cloud condensation nucleus remover". Journal of Geophysical Research. 103 (103): 28013–28019. Bibcode:1998JGR...10328013J. doi:10.1029/98JD01884. Archived from the original on 2022-03-20.

=== Global climate ===
- Shaw, G. E. (1983). "Bio-controlled thermostasis involving the sulfur cycle". Climate Change. 5 (5): 297–303. Bibcode:1983ClCh....5..297S. doi:10.1007/BF02423524. S2CID 91745077. Archived from the original on 2022-03-20. (342 citations as of April 2022.)
- Shaw, G. E. (1987). "Aerosols as climate regulators: A climate biosphere linkage?". Atmospheric Environment. 21 (21): 985–986. Bibcode:1987AtmEn..21..985S. doi:10.1016/0004-6981(87)90094-1. Archived from the original on 2022-03-20.

=== Miscellaneous ===
- Shaw, G. E. (1994). "On an interesting linkage between astrophysical and atomic variables in physics". Il Nuovo Cimento B. 109 (109): 1119–1122. Bibcode:1994NCimB.109.1119S. doi:10.1007/BF02723235. S2CID 121393144. Archived from the original on 2022-03-20.
