= Geophysical Institute =

US research institute

Coordinates: 64.8595°N 147.8498°W

The Geophysical Institute of the University of Alaska Fairbanks conducts research into space physics and aeronomy; atmospheric sciences; snow, ice, and permafrost; seismology; volcanology; and tectonics and sedimentation. It was founded in 1946 by an act of the United States Congress.

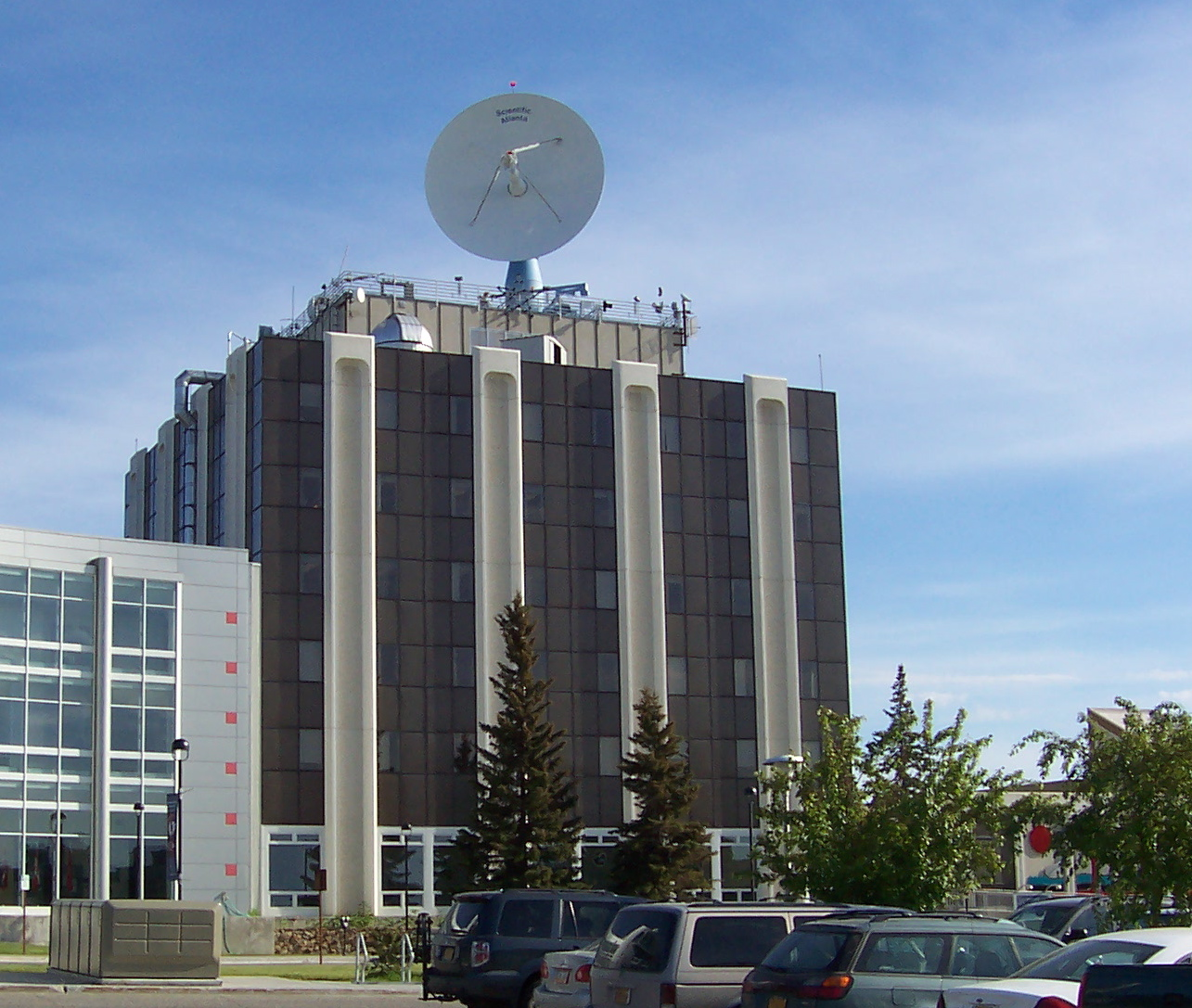
C.T. Elvey building in Summer

The mission of the Geophysical Institute is to:

- Understand basic geophysical processes governing the planet Earth, especially as they occur in or are relevant to Alaska;
- Train graduates and undergraduates to play leading scientific roles in tomorrow's society;
- Solve applied geophysical problems and develop related technologies of importance to the state and the nation;
- Satisfy the intellectual and technological needs of fellow Alaskans through public service.

== History ==
The United States Congress established the Geophysical Institute with an act approved on July 31, 1946, to study the aurora borealis, after auroral activity disrupted military communications during World War II. The funds from Congress were used to build the Geophysical Institute's main structure, which was finished in 1950. The building today is known as the Sydney Chapman Building.

The institute's first director, Stuart L. Seaton, served for nine months before resigning. While the Board of Regents looked for a new director, William S. Wilson, a professor of chemistry, was appointed to be the acting director. Wilson was able to recruit Sydney Chapman — who spent three months every year from 1951 to 1970 in Alaska.

In January 1952, the Board of Regents appointed astronomer Christian T. Elvey as the director of the institute. During this time, the first doctorate degree was awarded to Masahisa Sugiura who went on to become Head of the Analysis Section of the Magnetic and Electric Fields Branch at NASA's Goddard Space Flight Center. Elvey served as the institute's director until 1963 when he was succeeded by Keith B. Mather, namesake of the Mather Library, which is still part of the Geophysical Institute.

The early research done at the institute was focused on atmospheric science and space physics, then throughout the 1960s the research done was expanded to include fields such as glaciology, seismology and volcanology.

In 1968, the Defense Nuclear Agency wanted a location to launch research rockets — which prompted the start of the Poker Flat Research Range, 30 miles north of Fairbanks.

In 1970, the Geophysical Institute had outgrown the Chapman Building, and began to move into the newly constructed C.T. Elvey Building.

Currently, there are almost 300 employees working inside the Geophysical Institute, including 59 students.

== Research ==
The Geophysical Institute has seven research groups:

- Space Physics & Aeronomy
- Volcanology
- Remote Sensing
- Snow, Ice & Permafrost
- Tectonics & Sedimentation
- Atmospheric Sciences
- Seismology & Geodesy

== Facilities ==
The Geophysical Institute houses numerous facilities — from the Alaska Satellite Facility, whose radar images allow all-weather study of sea ice, earthquakes and volcanoes, to Poker Flat Research Range, the only university-owned rocket range in the world.

The research facilities at the Institute include:

- Alaska Earthquake Center
- Alaska Satellite Facility
- Alaska Volcano Observatory
- Poker Flat Research Range
- Alaska Center for Unmanned Aircraft Systems Integration (ACUASI)
- Alaska Climate Research Center
- Alaska Space Grant
- Arctic and Homeland Defense Center UARC
- Chaparral Physics
- College International Geophysical Observatory
- GeoData Center & Map Office
- Geographic Information Network of Alaska (GINA)
- Keith B. Mather Library
- High-frequency Active Auroral Research Program (HAARP)
- Instrument Development Services
- Petrology Lab
- Research Computing Systems
- SuperDARN
- Geochronology Facility
- Wilson Alaska Technical Center

== Notable Faculty and Alumni ==
- Syun-Ichi Akasofu: Aurora researcher and Institute director.
- Carl Benson: Geology and Geophysics Emeritus.
- Christian T. Elvey: Astronomer and director of the Geophysical Institute.
- Sydney Chapman: Mathematician and advisory scientific director of the Institute.
- T. Neil Davis: Co-inventor of the Elvey-Davis all-sky camera.
- Don L. Lind: NASA astronaut, who conducted postdoctoral research at the Institute.
- Masahisa Sugiura: First Ph.D. recipient.
- Erin Pettit: Glaciologist and creator of the Girls on Ice program.
- Keith B. Mather: Director of the Institute.
- Eugene M. Wescott
- Glenn Edmond Shaw: Atmospheric scientist who discovered the source of Arctic Haze and pioneered optical methods for remote sensing of atmospheric aerosols.

== See also ==
- Institute Peak
