= Arctic Circle =

Boundary of the Arctic

The Arctic Circle, at roughly 66.5° north, is a commonly-accepted boundary of the Arctic waters and lands

The Arctic Circle is one of the two polar circles, and the northernmost of the five major circles of latitude. It is shown on maps of Earth at about 66° 34' N. Its southern counterpart is the Antarctic Circle.

The Arctic Circle marks the southernmost latitude for which at the December solstice (winter) the Sun does not rise and at the June solstice (summer) the Sun does not set. These phenomena are referred to as polar night and midnight sun, respectively, and the closer to the pole one goes, the longer that situation persists. For example, in the Russian port city of Murmansk (three degrees north of the Arctic Circle) the Sun stays below the horizon for 20 days before and after the winter solstice, and above the horizon for 20 days before and after the summer solstice.

The positions of the Arctic and Antarctic Circles vary slightly from year to year. Currently the Arctic Circle is 66°33′51.1″ north of the Equator. Its latitude depends on Earth's axial tilt, which fluctuates by a margin of some 2° over a 41,000-year period due to tidal forces resulting from the orbit of the Moon. Consequently, in the current epoch the Arctic Circle is drifting toward the North Pole, while the Antarctic Circle drifts towards the South Pole, each at a speed of about 14.5 m (48 ft) per year.

== Etymology ==
The word arctic comes from the Greek word ἀρκτικός (arktikos: "near the Bear, northern") and that from the word ἄρκτος (arktos: "bear").

== Midnight sun and polar night ==
Relationship of Earth's axial tilt (ε) to the tropical and polar circles

The Arctic Circle is the southernmost latitude in the Northern Hemisphere at which the centre of the Sun can remain continuously above or below the horizon for twenty-four hours; as a result, at least once each year at any location within the Arctic Circle the centre of the Sun is visible at local midnight, and at least once the centre is not visible at local noon.

Directly on the Arctic Circle these events occur, in principle, exactly once per year: at the June and December solstices, respectively. However, because of atmospheric refraction and mirages, and also because the sun appears as a disk and not a point, part of the midnight sun is visible, on the night of the northern summer solstice, at a latitude of about 50 minutes of arc (′) (90 km (56 mi)) south of the Arctic Circle. Similarly, on the day of the northern winter solstice, part of the Sun may be seen up to about 50′ north of the Arctic Circle. That is true at sea level; those limits increase with elevation above sea level, although in mountainous regions there is often no direct view of the true horizon.

== Human habitation ==
Plate carrée projection showing the Arctic Circle in red

The largest communities north of the Arctic Circle are situated in Russia, Norway, and Sweden: Murmansk (population 295,374) and Norilsk (178,018) in Russia; Tromsø (75,638) in Norway, Vorkuta (58,133) in Russia, Bodø (52,357) and Harstad (24,703) in Norway; and Kiruna, Sweden (22,841). In Finland, the largest settlement in the immediate vicinity of the Arctic Circle is Rovaniemi (62,667), lying 6 km (4 mi) south of the line. Salekhard (51,186) in Russia is the only city in the world located directly on the Arctic Circle.

In contrast, the largest Danish community north of the Arctic Circle, Sisimiut (Greenland), has approximately 5,600 inhabitants. In the United States, Utqiagvik, Alaska (formerly known as Barrow) is the largest settlement north of the Arctic Circle with about 5,000 inhabitants. The largest such community in Canada is Inuvik in the Northwest Territories, with 3,137 inhabitants.

=== Exclusive economic zones ===
The Arctic region, defined as the area north of 66°33′ N latitude, comprises land, internal waters, territorial seas, and exclusive economic zones (EEZs). All land and non-international waters within this circle fall under the jurisdiction of eight states: Canada, the Kingdom of Denmark (via Greenland), Finland, Iceland, Norway, Russia, Sweden, and the United States.

Under international law, including the United Nations Convention on the Law of the Sea (UNCLOS), the North Pole and the surrounding high seas of the Arctic Ocean are not owned by any country. Sovereignty in the region is managed through established maritime zones, though the "Arctic Five" (Canada, Denmark, Norway, Russia, and the United States) maintain specific rights over their respective continental shelves and EEZs.

== Geography ==
North polar projection map showing the Arctic Circle

The Arctic Circle is roughly 16,000 km (9,900 mi) in circumference. The area north of the Circle is about 20,000,000 km^{2} (7,700,000 sq mi) and covers roughly 4% of Earth's surface.

The Arctic Circle passes through the Arctic Ocean, the Scandinavian Peninsula, North Asia, Northern America, and Greenland. The land within the Arctic Circle is divided among eight countries: Norway, Sweden, Finland, Russia, the United States (Alaska), Canada (Yukon, Northwest Territories, and Nunavut), Denmark (Greenland), and Iceland (where it passes through the small offshore island of Grímsey).

=== Climate ===
The climate north of the Arctic Circle is generally cold, but the coastal areas of Norway have a generally mild climate as a result of the Gulf Stream, which makes the ports of northern Norway and northwest Russia ice-free all year long. In the interior, summers can be quite warm, while winters are extremely cold. For example, summer temperatures in Norilsk, Russia will sometimes reach as high as 30 °C (86 °F), while the winter temperatures frequently fall below −50 °C (−58 °F).

=== Sites along the Arctic Circle ===
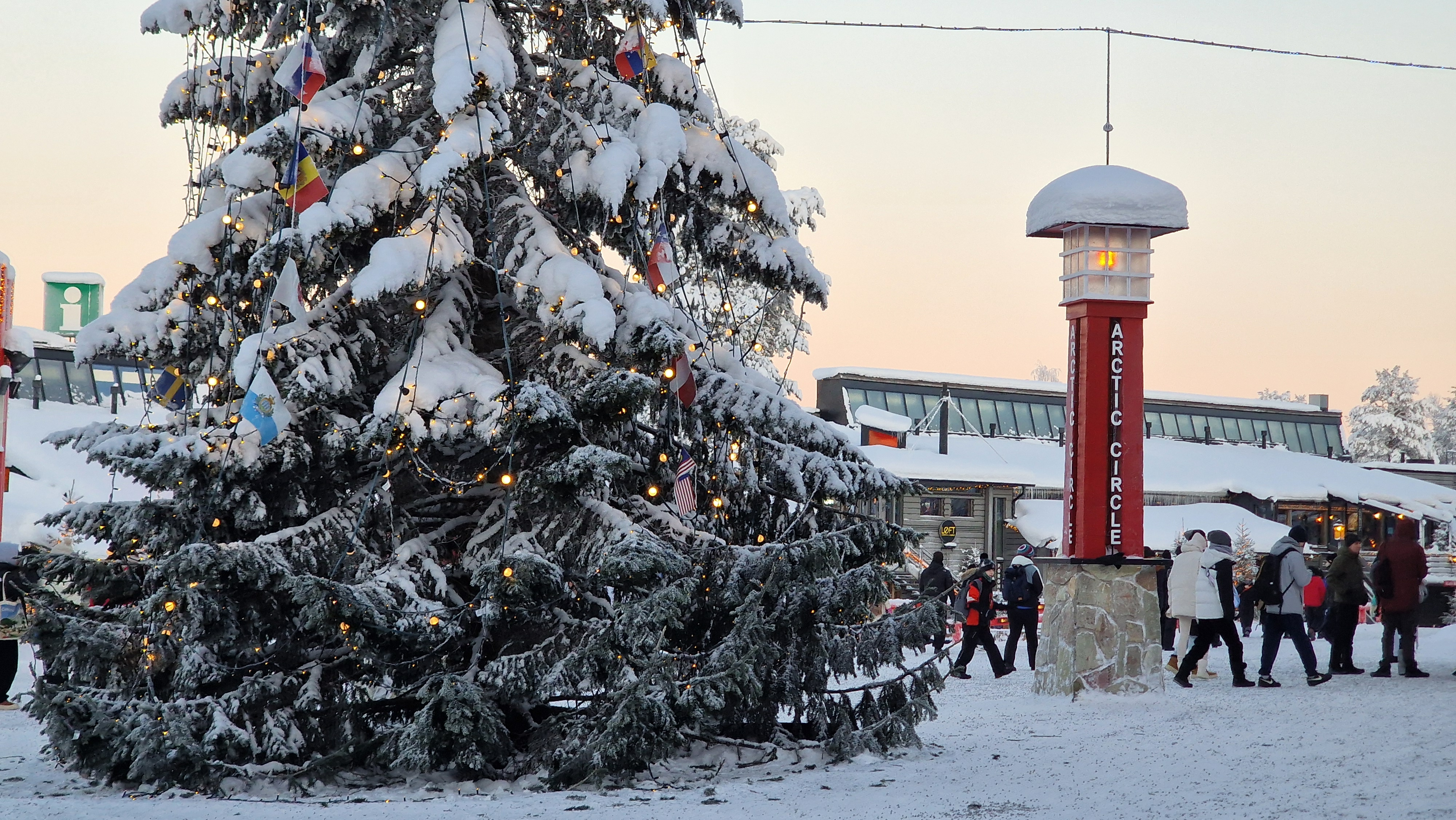
Arctic Circle near to Santa Claus Village in Rovaniemi, Finland

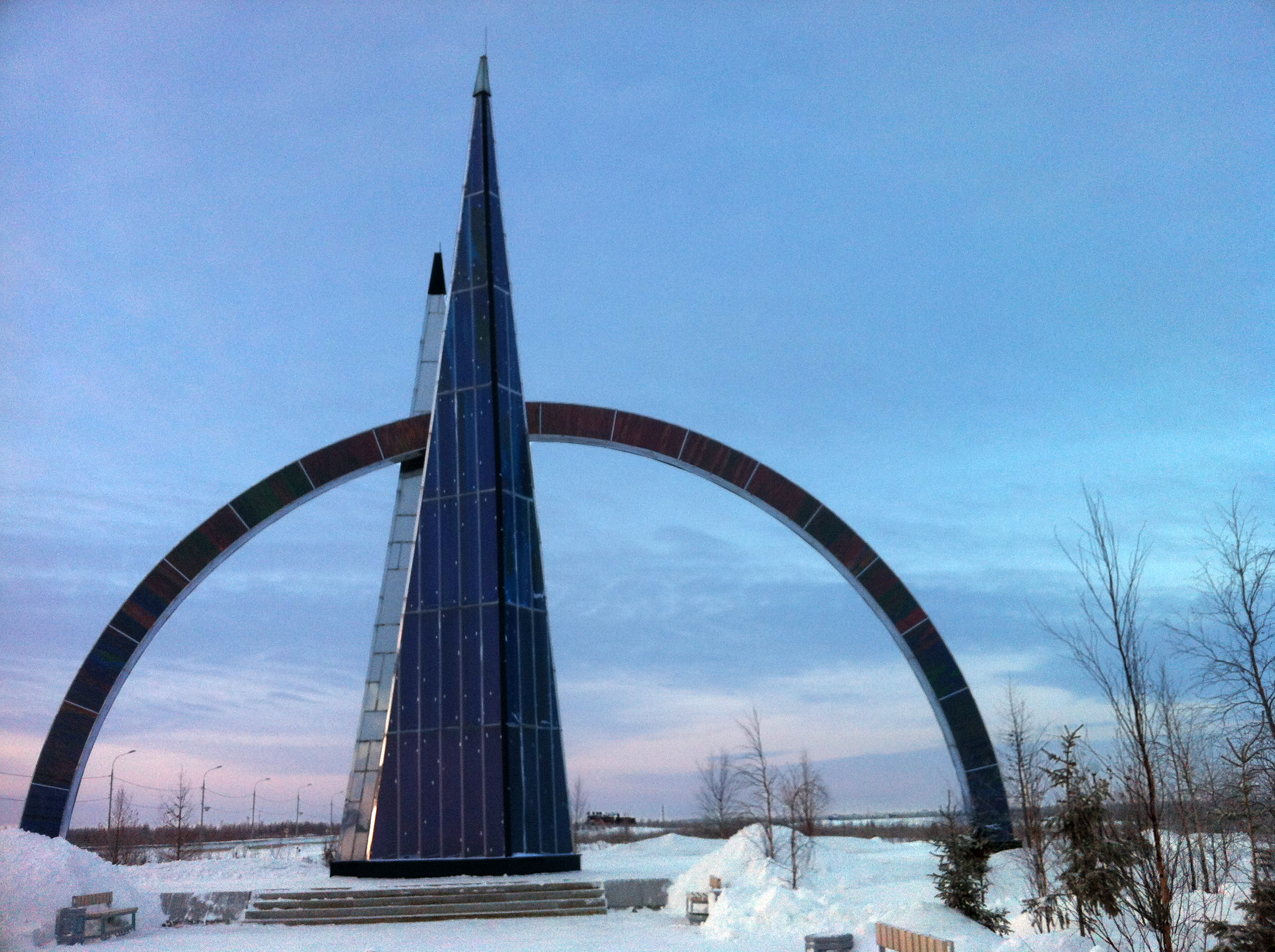
Arctic Circle monument in Salekhard, Russia

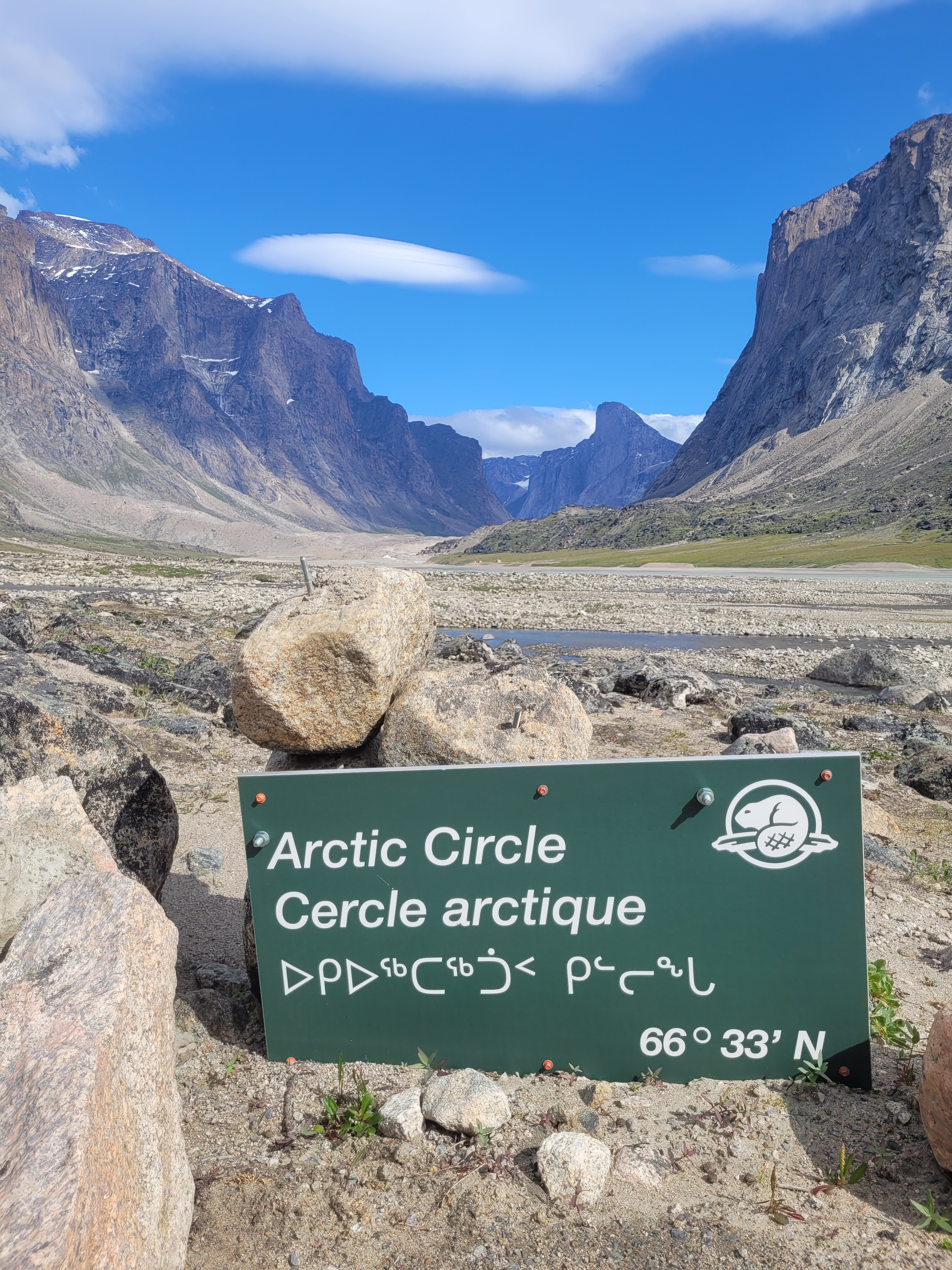
Parks Canada Arctic Circle sign in Auyuittuq National Park, Baffin Island, Nunavut, with Mount Thor in the background

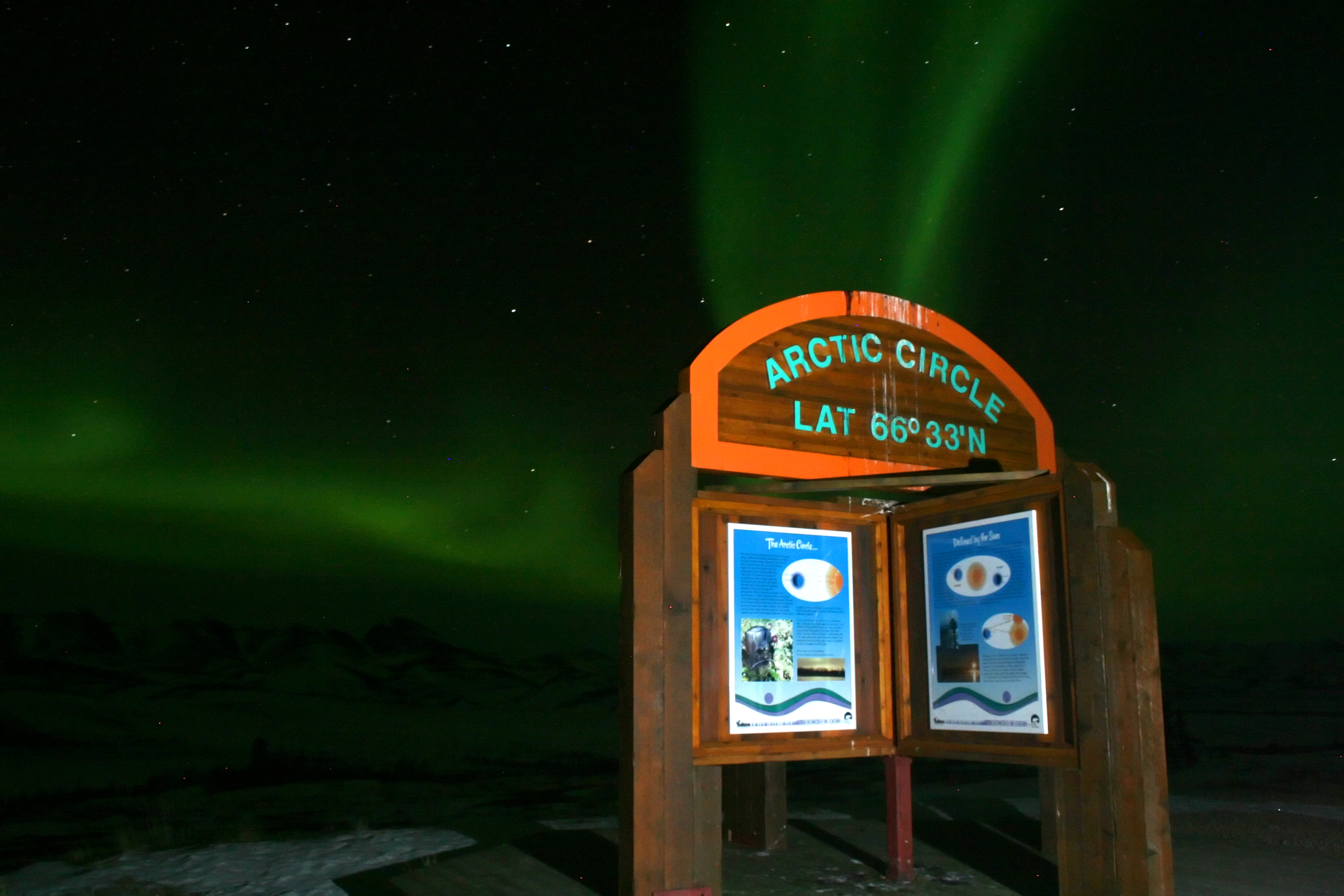
Aurora Borealis above Arctic Circle sign along the Dempster Highway in Yukon at 66°33′55″N 136°18′26″W

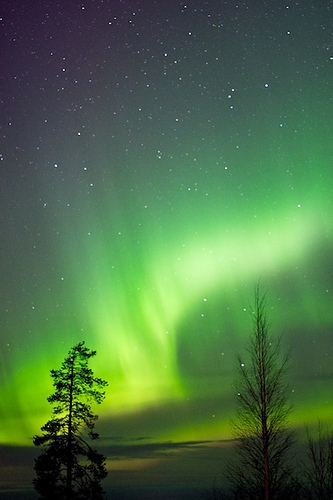
At night, bright aurora borealis are a fairly common sight in the Arctic Circle. The picture of the northern lights in Rovaniemi.

Starting at the prime meridian and heading eastwards, the Arctic Circle passes through:

| Coordinates (approximate) | Country, territory, or ocean | Location |
|---|---|---|
| 66°34′N 0°0′E | Atlantic Ocean | Norwegian Sea |
| 66°34′N 12°3′E | Norway | Islands and skerries of Træna Municipality, Nordland County |
| 66°34′N 12°18′E | Atlantic Ocean | Trænfjorden, Norwegian Sea |
| 66°34′N 12°29′E | Norway | Islands and skerries of Nesøya, Nordland County |
| 66°34′N 12°41′E | Atlantic Ocean | Nesøyfjorden, Norwegian Sea |
| 66°34′N 12°49′E | Norway | Islands and skerries of Storselsøya, Nordland County |
| 66°34′N 12°52′E | Atlantic Ocean | Kvarøyfjorden, Norwegian Sea |
| 66°34′N 12°57′E | Norway | Islands and skerries of Rangsundøya, Nordland County, including Vikingen island |
| 66°34′N 13°3′E | Atlantic Ocean | Værangfjorden, Norwegian Sea |
| 66°34′N 13°12′E | Norway | Nordland County |
| 66°34′N 15°33′E | Sweden | Norrbotten County (Provinces of Lapland and Norrbotten) |
| 66°34′N 23°52′E | Finland | Lapland Region, crosses Rovaniemi Airport |
| 66°34′N 29°28′E | Russia | Republic of Karelia |
| 66°34′N 31°36′E | Russia | Murmansk Oblast |
| 66°34′N 32°37′E | Russia | Republic of Karelia |
| 66°34′N 33°10′E | Russia | Grand Island, Murmansk Oblast |
| 66°34′N 33°25′E | Arctic Ocean | Kandalaksha Gulf, White Sea, Barents Sea |
| 66°34′N 34°28′E | Russia | Kola Peninsula, Murmansk Oblast — for about 7 km (4.3 mi) |
| 66°34′N 34°38′E | Arctic Ocean | Kandalaksha Gulf, White Sea, Barents Sea |
| 66°34′N 35°0′E | Russia | Kola Peninsula, Murmansk Oblast |
| 66°34′N 40°42′E | Arctic Ocean | White Sea, Barents Sea |
| 66°34′N 44°23′E | Russia | Nenets Autonomous Okrug |
| 66°34′N 50°51′E | Russia | Komi Republic |
| 66°34′N 63°48′E | Russia | Yamalo-Nenets Autonomous Okrug |
| 66°34′N 71°5′E | Arctic Ocean | Gulf of Ob, Kara Sea |
| 66°34′N 72°27′E | Russia | Yamalo-Nenets Autonomous Okrug |
| 66°34′N 83°3′E | Russia | Krasnoyarsk Krai |
| 66°34′N 106°18′E | Russia | Yukaghir Highlands, Sakha Republic |
| 66°34′N 158°38′E | Russia | Anadyr Highlands and Chukotka Mountains, Chukotka Autonomous Okrug |
| 66°34′N 171°1′W | Arctic Ocean | Chukchi Sea |
| 66°34′N 164°38′W | United States | Seward Peninsula, Alaska |
| 66°34′N 163°44′W | Arctic Ocean | Kotzebue Sound, Chukchi Sea |
| 66°34′N 161°56′W | United States | Alaska—passing through Selawik Lake |
| 66°34′N 141°0′W | Canada | Yukon |
| 66°34′N 133°36′W | Canada | Northwest Territories, passing through Great Bear Lake |
| 66°34′N 115°56′W | Canada | Nunavut |
| 66°34′N 82°59′W | Arctic Ocean | Foxe Basin |
| 66°34′N 73°25′W | Canada | Nunavut (Baffin Island), passing through Nettilling Lake and Auyuittuq National Park (sign location) |
| 66°34′N 61°24′W | Atlantic Ocean | Davis Strait |
| 66°34′N 53°16′W | Greenland | Passing through Kangerlussuaq Fjord and Schweizerland |
| 66°34′N 34°9′W | Atlantic Ocean | Denmark Strait |
| 66°34′N 26°18′W | Atlantic Ocean | Greenland Sea |
| 66°34′N 18°1′W | Iceland | Island of Grímsey |
| 66°34′N 17°59′W | Atlantic Ocean | Greenland Sea |
| 66°34′N 12°32′W | Atlantic Ocean | Norwegian Sea |

== Gallery ==
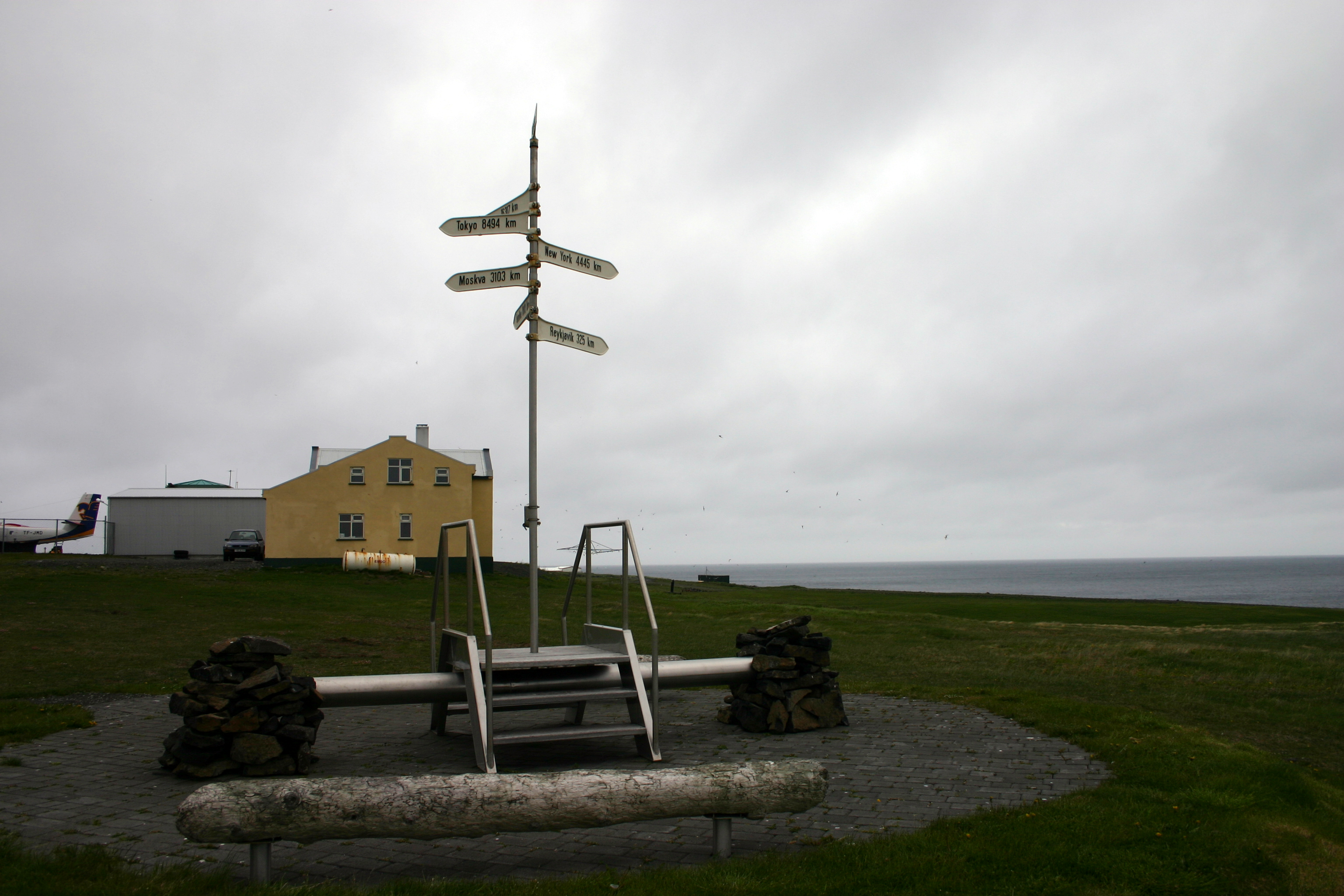
Arctic Circle marker on island of Grímsey in Iceland

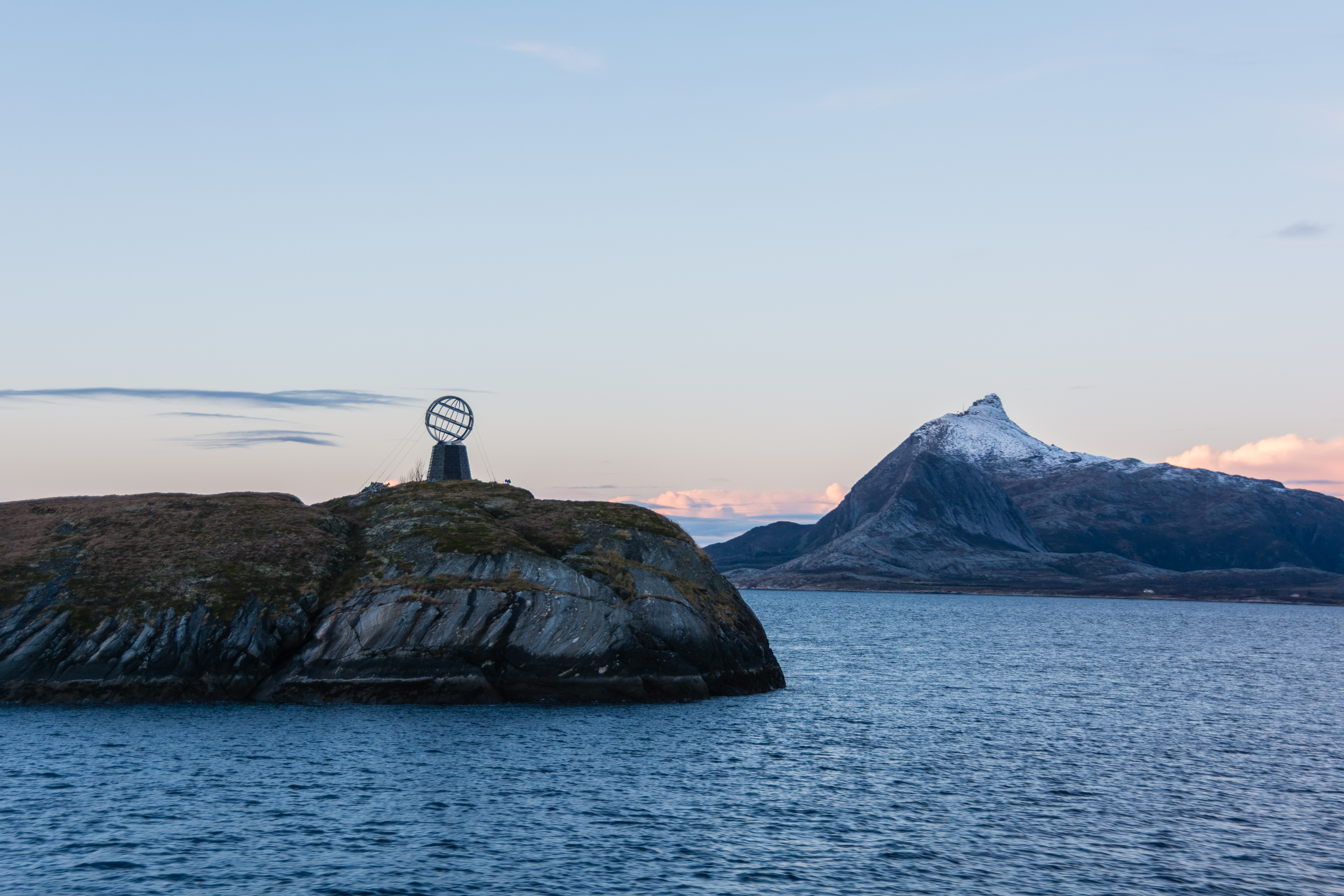
Northern Polar Circle Globe on Vikingen island marking the Arctic Circle in Norway

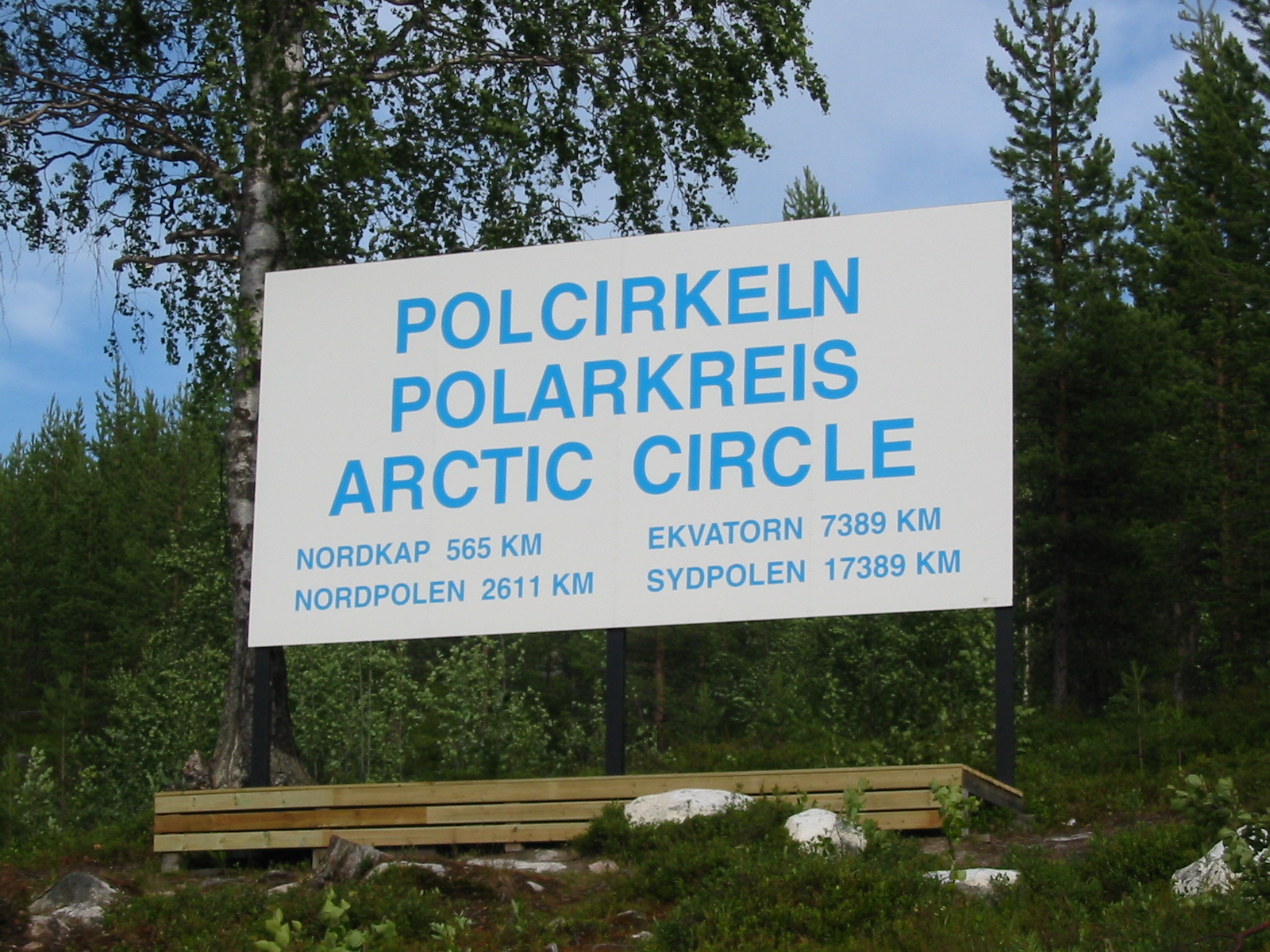
Arctic Circle sign by the Inland Line railway, Sweden

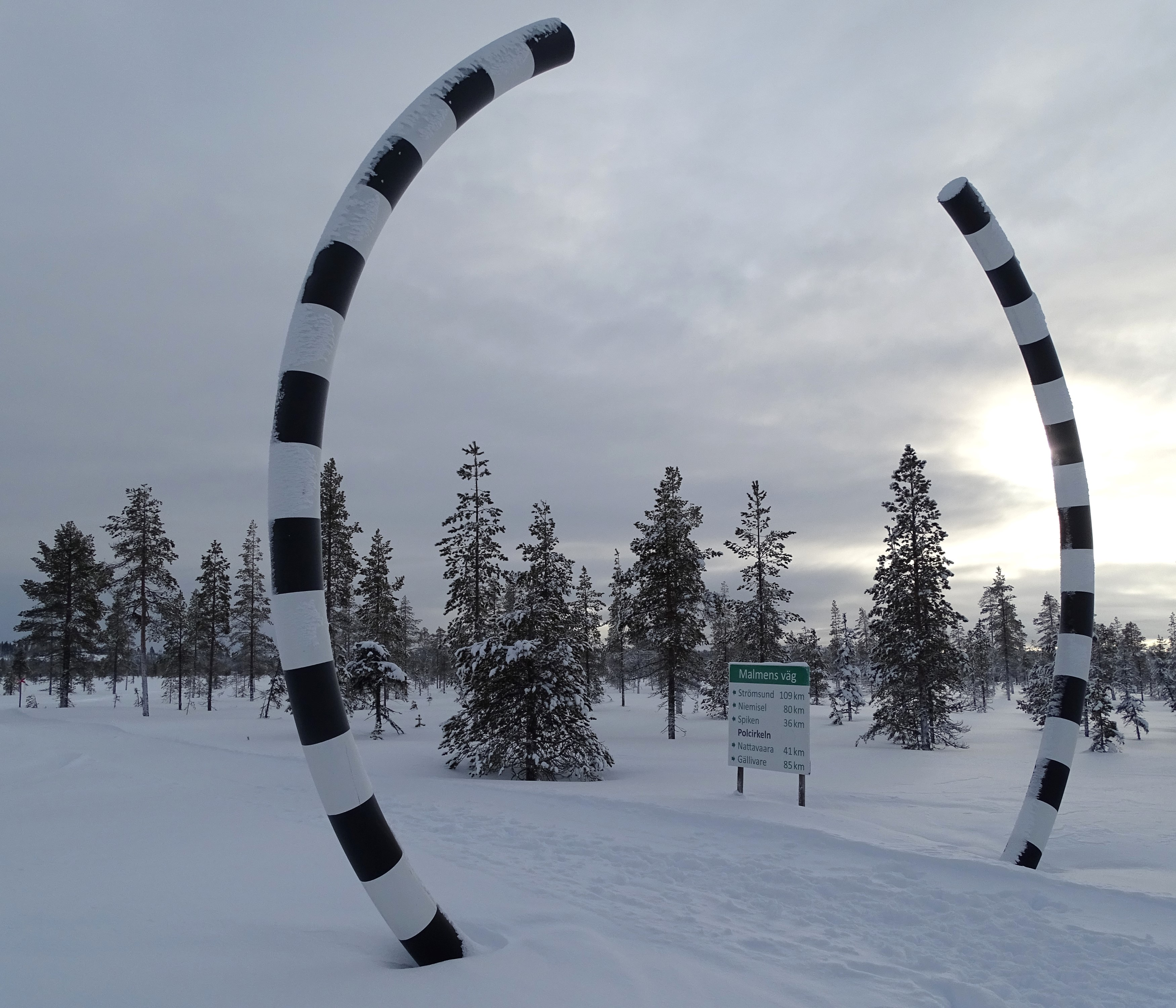
Polcirkeln portal near Nattavaara, Sweden

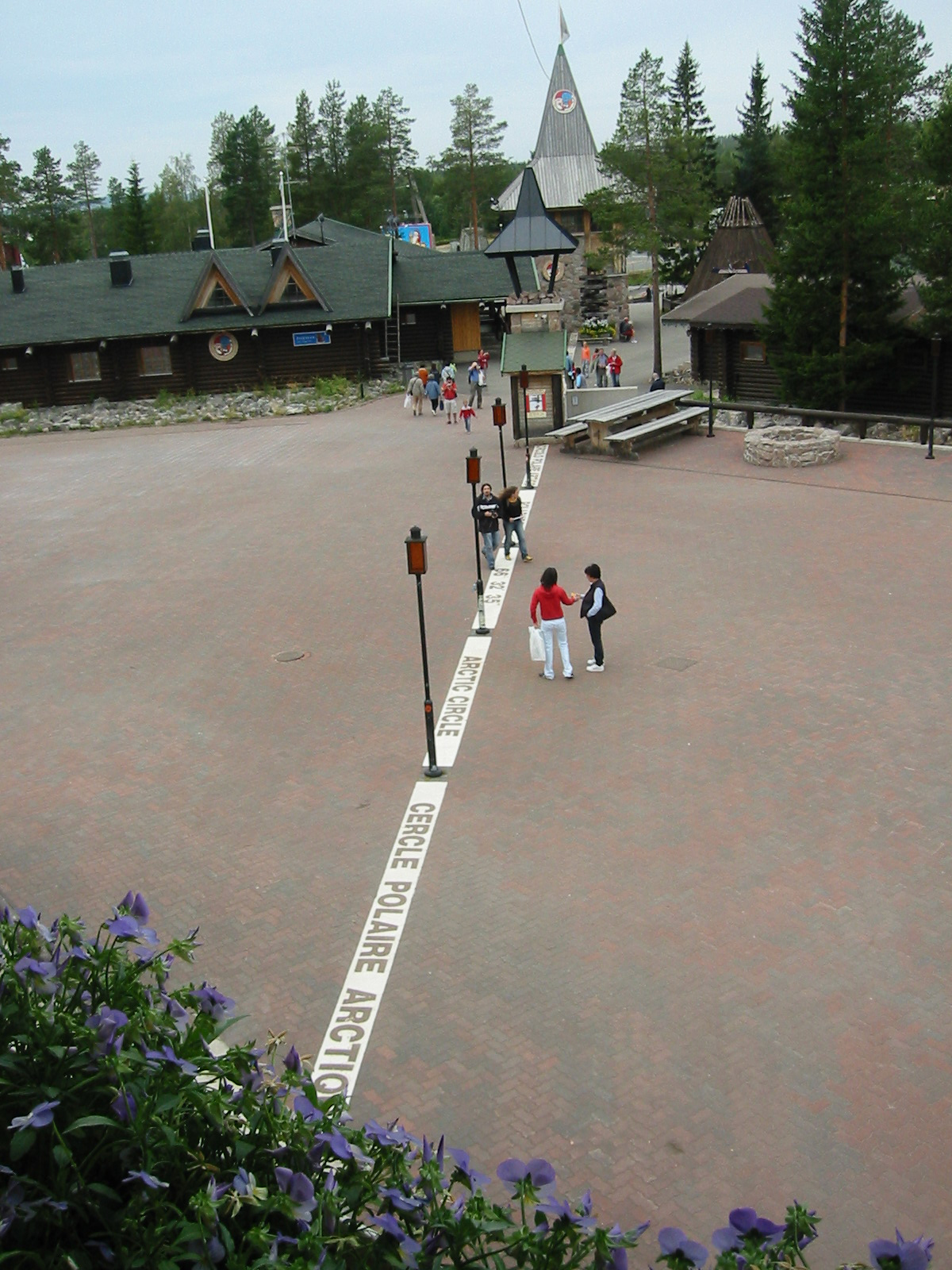
The white borderline of the Arctic Circle at the Santa Claus Village in Rovaniemi, Finland

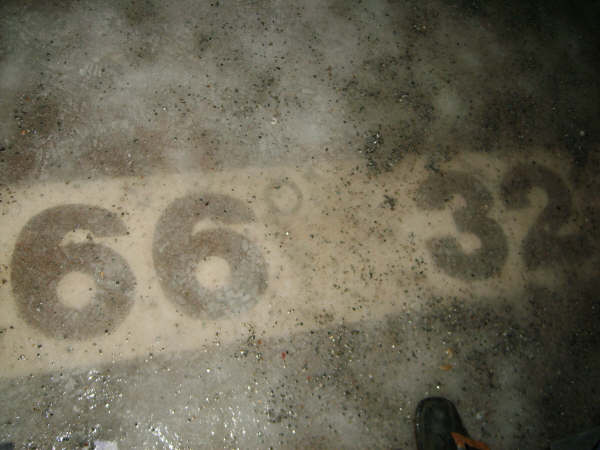
Arctic Circle line 66° 32′ 35″ in Santa Claus Village, Finland

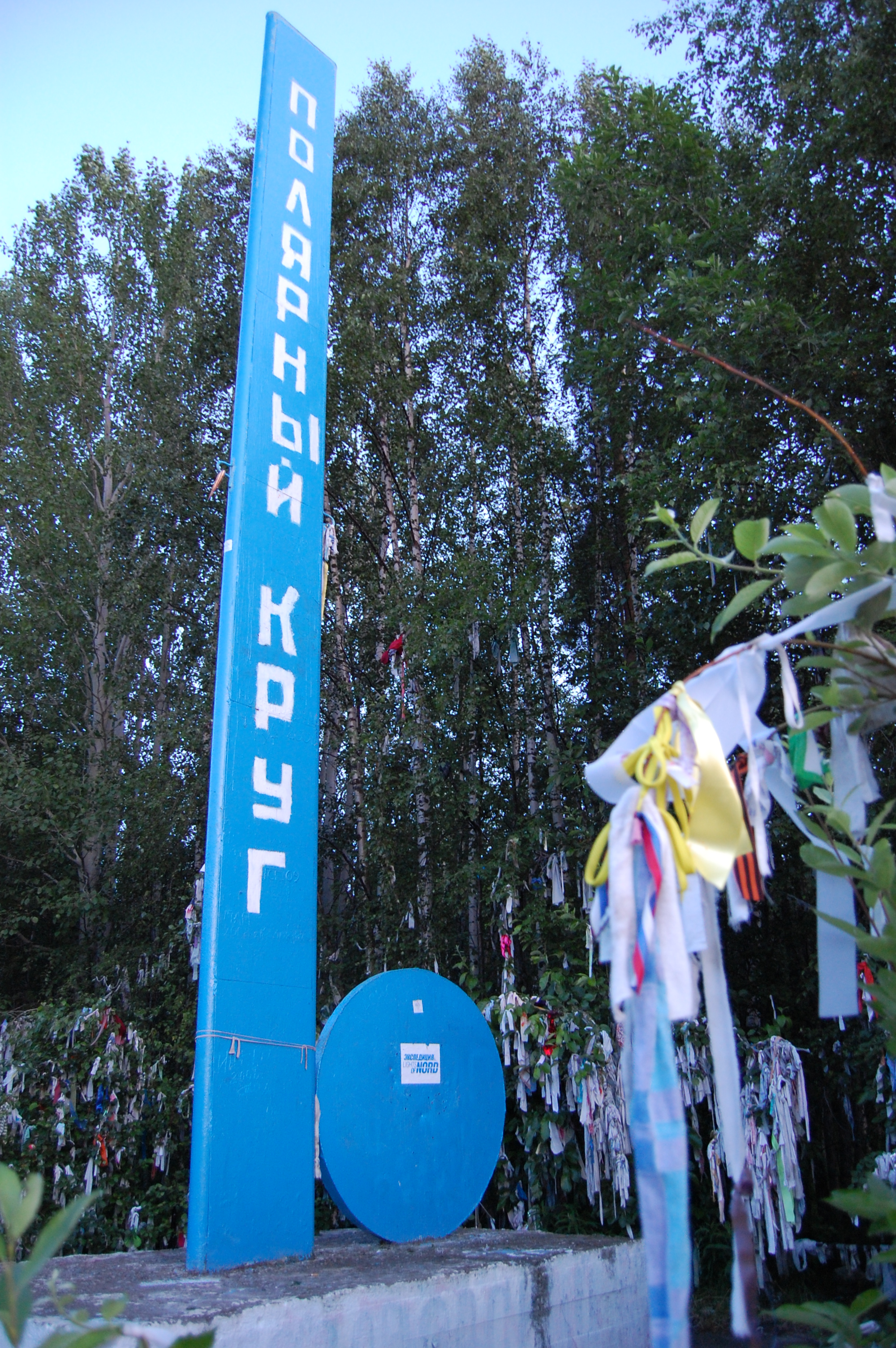
Arctic Circle sign in the Republic of Karelia, Russia

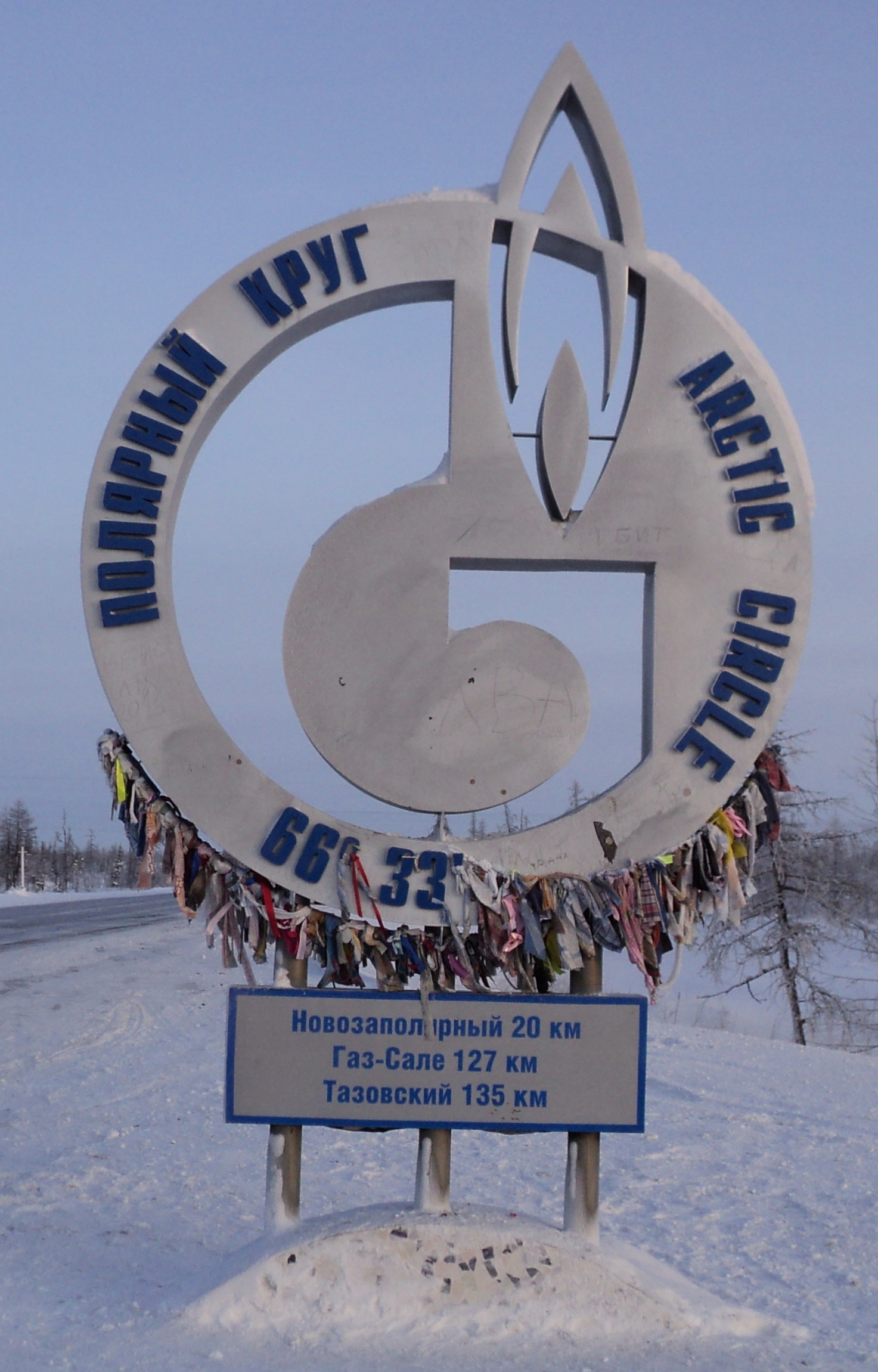
Arctic Circle sign in the Tazovsky District, Russia

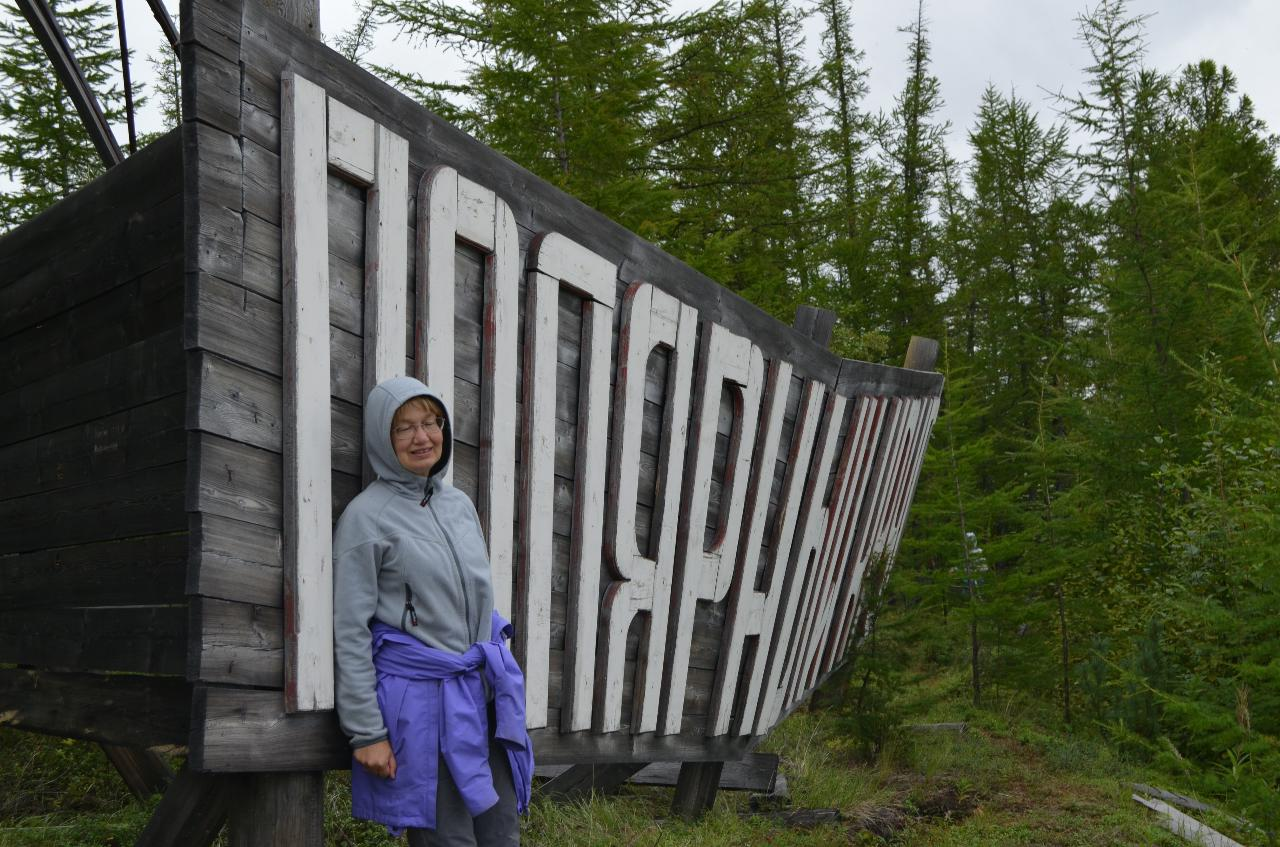
A sign near Zhigansk (Yakutia), Russia

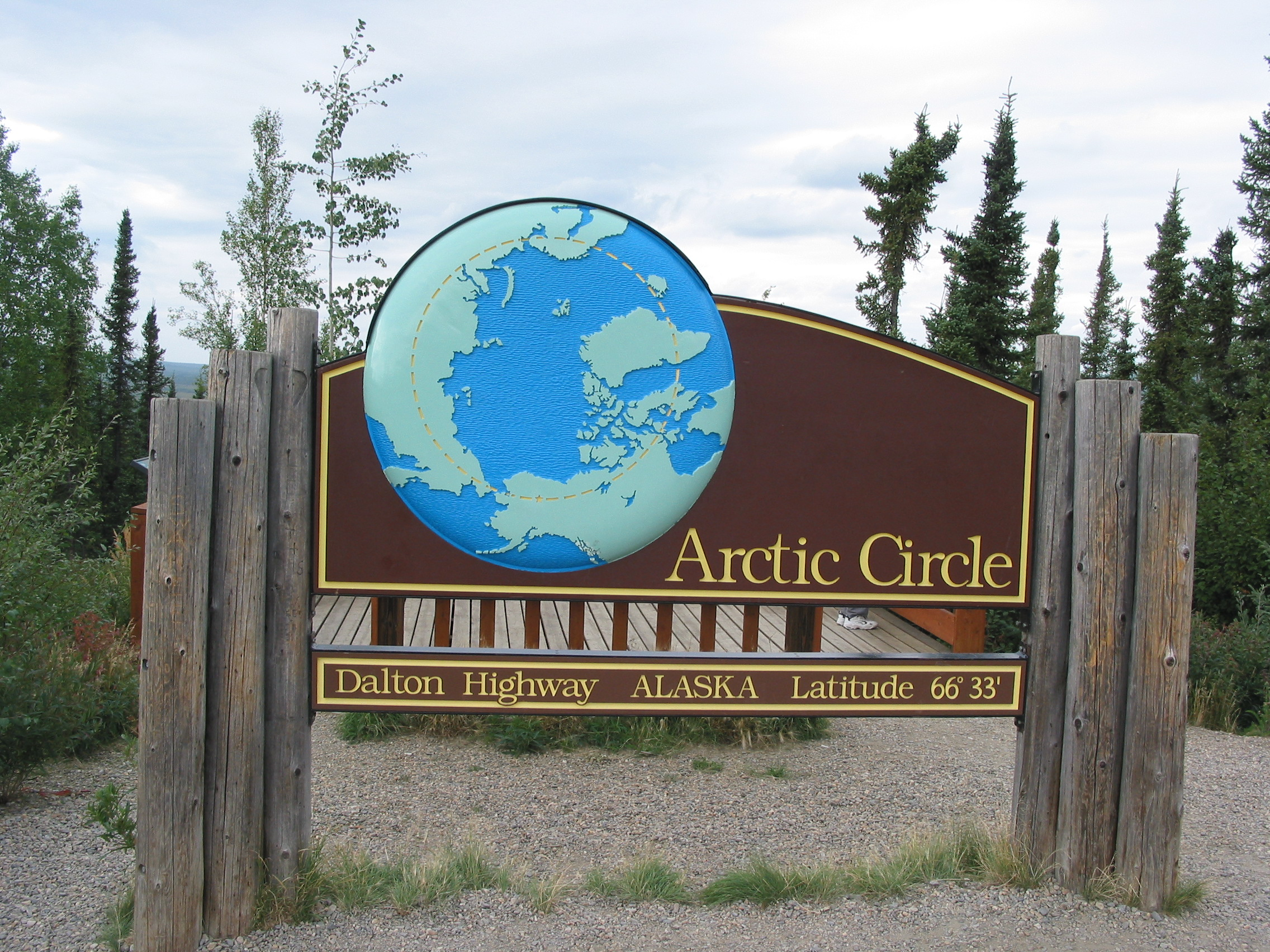
A sign along the Dalton Highway marking the location of the Arctic Circle in Alaska, United States

== See also ==
- 60th parallel north
- Arctic cooperation and politics
- Arctic haze
- Circumpolar star
- Scott Polar Research Institute
- Territorial claims in the Arctic
- Tropic of Cancer
- Tropic of Capricorn
