= T. Neil Davis =

American geophysicist (1932–2016)

Thomas Neil Davis (February 1, 1932 – December 10, 2016) was an American professor of geophysics from the University of Alaska Fairbanks and the author of several books. Born in Greeley, Colorado, Davis received his B.S in geophysics from University of Alaska Fairbanks in 1955, an M.S. in geophysics from California Institute of Technology in 1957, and a Ph.D. in geophysics from University of Alaska Fairbanks in 1961. Davis spent most of his working career at the Geophysical Institute, pioneering the use of all-sky and low-level light cameras for the study of the aurora borealis and conducting rocket studies of the aurora. With Masahisa Sugiura (while both were at NASA Goddard Space Flight Center) he introduced the AE (auroral electrojet) index now commonly used as a measure of solar-terrestrial interaction. A student of Beno Gutenberg and Charles Richter at Caltech, he also has done work in observational seismology.

== Books and publications ==
=== Fiction ===
- 2004. The Great Alaska Zingwater Caper. McRoy & Blackburn, Publishers.
- 1997. Battling Against Success. McRoy & Blackburn, Publishers.
- 1994. Caught in the Sluice. McRoy & Blackburn, Publishers.

=== Nonfiction ===
- 2011. The Painting on the Window Blind: the story of an unknown artist and a daring Civil War spy. IUniverse.
- 2008. Mired in the Health Care Morass: An Alaskan Takes on America's Dysfunctional Medical System for his Uninsured Daughter. Alaska-Yukon Press and Ester Republic Press.
- 2006. Rockets Over Alaska: The Genesis of Poker Flat. Alaska-Yukon Press.
- 2001. Permafrost. A guide to frozen ground in transition. University of Alaska Press.
- 1993. The College Hill Chronicles. How the University of Alaska Came of Age. University of Alaska Foundation.
- 1992. The Aurora Watcher's Handbook. University of Alaska Press.
- 1984. ENERGY/ALASKA. University of Alaska Press.
- 1982. Alaska Science Nuggets. University of Alaska Press.

==== Columns ====
- 2007–2011. "Dose of Reality": monthly column appearing in The Ester Republic.
- 1976–1982. "Alaska Science Nuggets": weekly science column appearing in the Fairbanks Daily News-Miner.

== Sources ==
- Neil Davis' webpage
- health issues blog
- University of Alaska Stories Behind the Names
- Neil Davis helped propel UAF with unlikely homemade rocket range
