= Vikingen, Nordland =

Island in Nordland, Norway

Vikingen
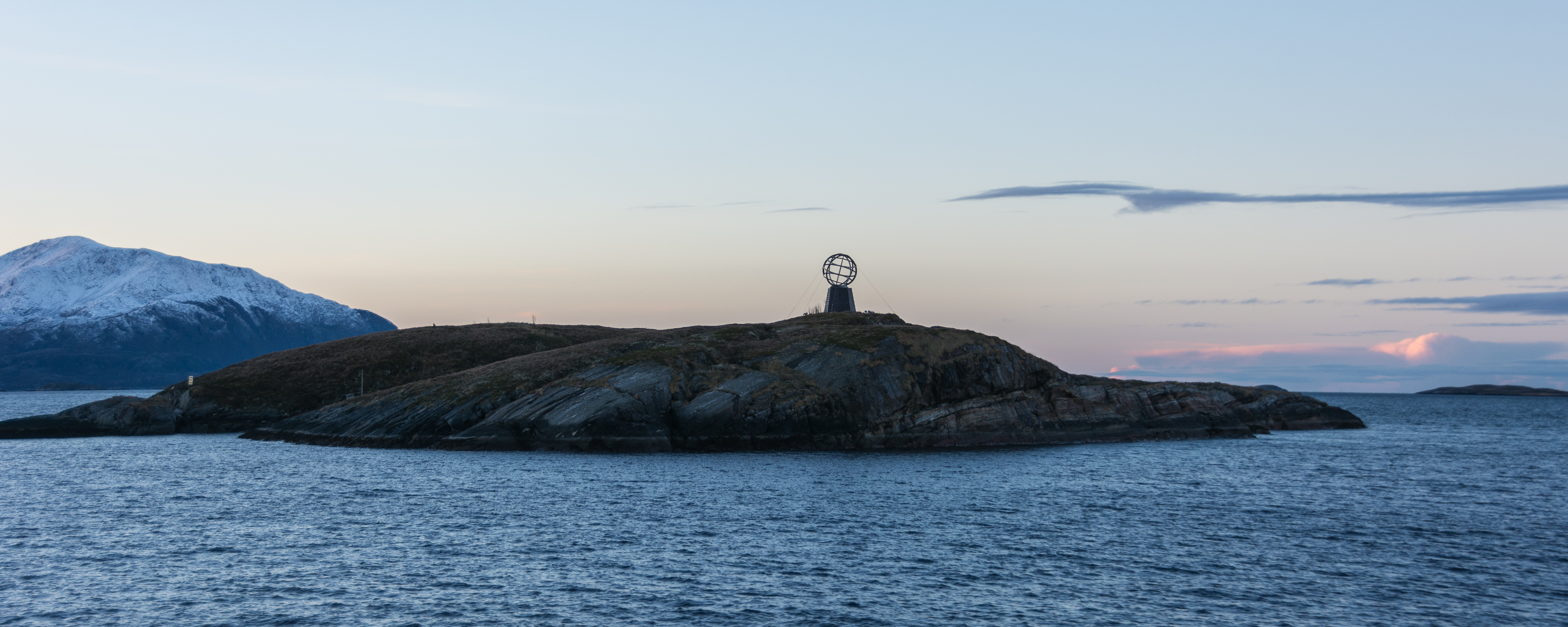
- Arctic Circle marker at 66°33'on the island of Vikingen, Norway
- Interactive map of Vikingen

Geography
- Location: Nordland, Norway
- Coordinates: 66.53255°N 12.97121°E

Administration
- Norway
- County: Nordland
- Municipality: Rødøy Municipality

Vikingen is a small island in the southern part of Rødøy Municipality in Nordland county, Norway. Vikingen is situated north of the village of Tonnes (in neighboring Lurøy Municipality). The island is notable for having the Arctic Circle pass through it, something that is marked by a small statue with a globe. It is possible to view the midnight sun from Vikingen.
