= Institute Peak =

Mountain in Alaska, United States

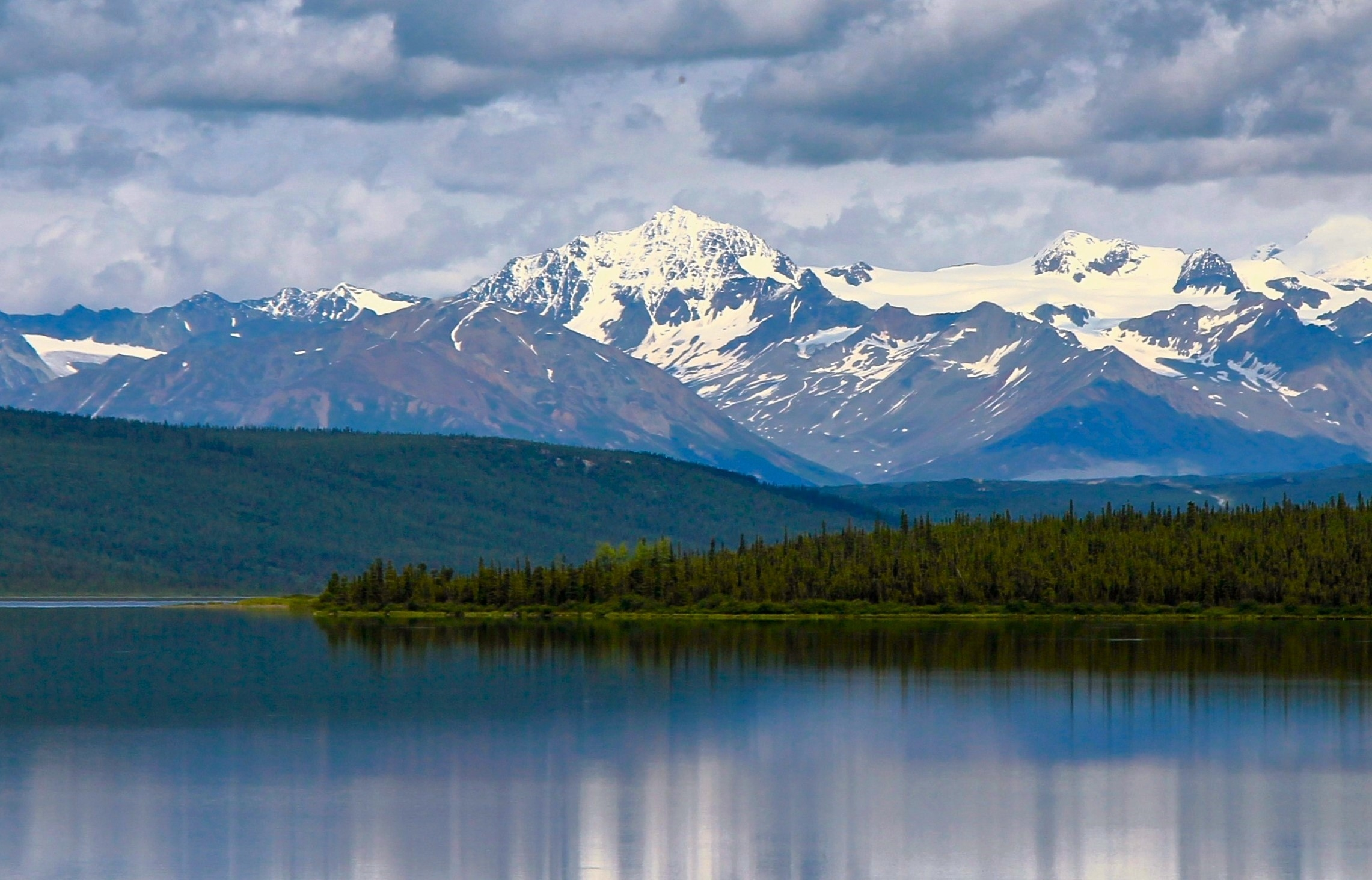
- South aspect, from Paxson Lake

Highest point
- Elevation: 8,022 ft (2,445 m)
- Prominence: 2,000 ft (610 m)
- Isolation: 4.4 mi (7.1 km)
- Coordinates: 63°17′31″N 145°29′54″W

Naming
- Etymology: Geophysical Institute

Geography
- Location within Alaska
- Interactive map of Institute Peak
- Country: United States
- State: Alaska
- Census Area: Southeast Fairbanks
- Parent range: Alaska Range; Delta Mountains
- Topo map: USGS Mount Hayes B-3

Climbing
- First ascent: 1954

Institute Peak is an 8,022-foot-elevation (2,445-meter) mountain summit in Alaska.

== Description ==
Institute Peak is located 18 miles (29 km) north of Paxson in the Delta Mountains which are a subrange of the Alaska Range. Precipitation runoff and glacial meltwater from the mountain's slopes drains into tributaries of the Delta River. Topographic relief is significant as the summit rises 2,900 feet (884 meters) above the West Gulkana Glacier in one mile (1.6 km) and 3,600 feet (1,097 meters) above the Canwell Glacier in 1.5 mile (2.4 km).

== History ==
The first ascent of the summit was made in 1954 by four members of the Geophysical Institute at University of Alaska Fairbanks: Phil Bettler, Keith Hart, George Swenson, and Keaton Keller, along with George Schaller. The group named the peak after the institute. The Alaska Alpine Club was founded in 1952 by students and faculty of this institute.

The first winter ascent was made in February 1960 by Gene Wescott, Chuck Deehr, and Moonok Sunwoo. Gene Wescott also worked at the Geophysical Institute.

The mountain's toponym was officially adopted in 1969 by the United States Board on Geographic Names.

== Climate ==
According to the Köppen climate classification system, Institute Peak is located in a tundra climate zone with cold, snowy winters, and cool summers. Weather systems are forced upwards by the Delta Mountains (orographic lift), causing heavy precipitation in the form of rainfall and snowfall. Winter temperatures can drop below 0 °F with wind chill factors below −10 °F. This climate supports the Canwell Glacier, Gulkana Glacier, and West Gulkana Glacier surrounding the peak.

== See also ==
- Geography of Alaska
