= J. Murray Mitchell =

American climatologist

J. Murray Mitchell, Jr.
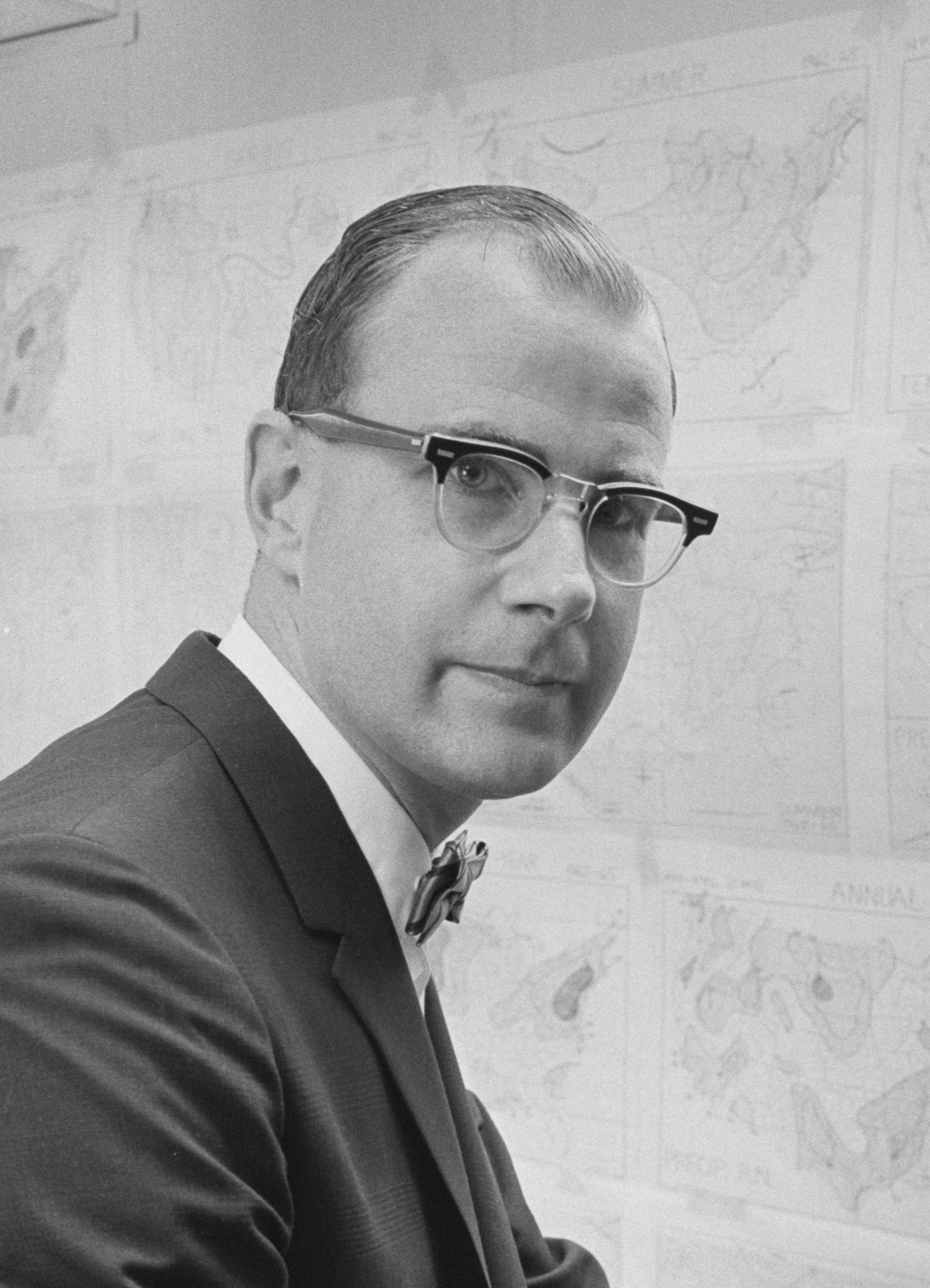
- Mitchell in 1967
- Born: John Murray Mitchell Jr. September 17, 1928; New York City, U.S.
- Died: October 5, 1990 (aged 62); Washington, D.C., U.S.
- Citizenship: American
- Education: MIT
- Known for: Investigation of the arctic haze
- Scientific career
- Fields: Climatology

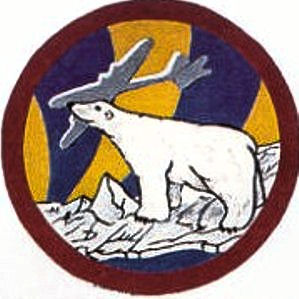
1950s emblem of the 58th Weather Reconnaissance Squadron in Alaska.

John Murray Mitchell Jr. (September 17, 1928 – October 5, 1990) was an American climatologist. As a United States Air Force weather officer in Alaska from 1952 to 1955, he investigated and named the Arctic haze. He served with the United States Weather Bureau and successor agencies from 1955 until his retirement in 1986, and was a prominent member of the National Academy of Sciences and the National Science Foundation. The Mitchell Glacier was named after him.

== Early life ==
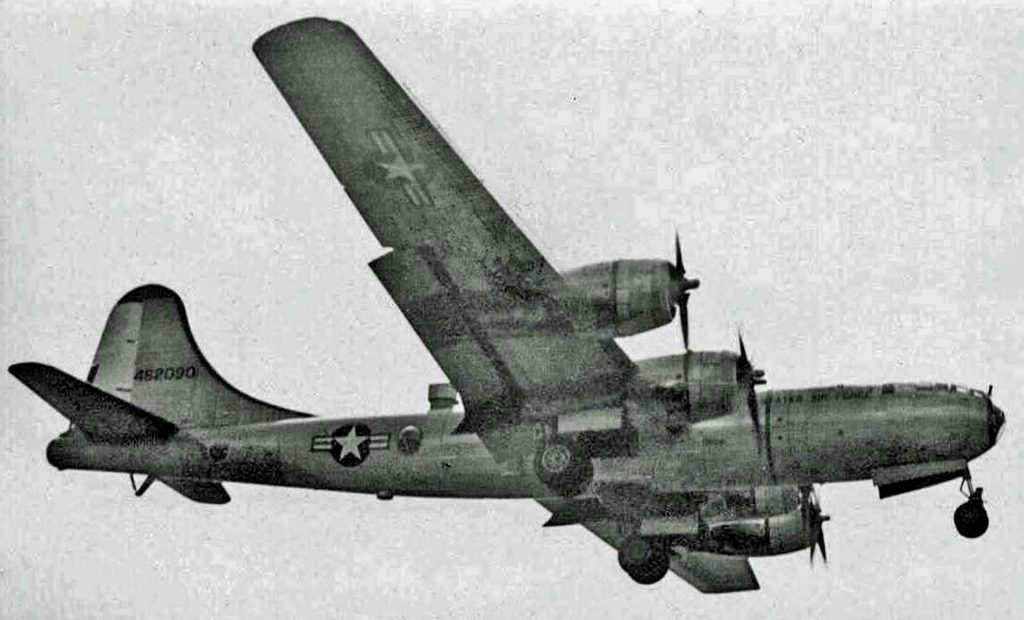
WB-29 Superfortress, as used for weather reconnaissance in Alaska in the early 1950s.

John Murray Mitchell Jr. was born on September 17, 1928, in New York City. He grew up in Tuxedo Park, New York, and as an adolescent became interested in weather and climate. His studies at the Massachusetts Institute of Technology led to a bachelor's degree in 1951 and a master's in 1952. He then served as a United States Air Force weather officer in Alaska for three years. During this time, he observed a Spring haze, at times as dense as smog, which he called Arctic haze. His investigation into the particles forming the haze indicated that it had come from industrial areas of Europe and China.

In 1955 he became a research meteorologist with the United States Weather Bureau, and in 1960 he earned a doctorate at Pennsylvania State University on US temperature change. In 1965 he became a project scientist on climatic change with the newly formed Environmental Science Services Administration, which five years later became part of the National Oceanic and Atmospheric Administration (NOAA). In that organization he became a senior climatologist in 1974, and senior research climatologist from 1983 until his retirement in 1986. He continued to serve as a climatology consultant to the government after his retirement.

Mitchell was a pioneer in investigation and understanding of climate change. In 1976 he described the conjecture of global cooling as irresponsible, and around that time supported other scientists in warning of the damaging effects of increasing CO_{2} in the atmosphere. In 1978 he became executive editor of Weatherwise magazine. He was a member of the Polar Research Board of the National Academy of Sciences from 1978 to 1982, and Chairman of the Committee on Polar Regions and Climatic Change from 1979 to 1984. He was also a member of the Advisory Committee to the Division of Polar Programs of the National Science Foundation (NSF) from 1988 to 1990.

== Research work ==
Mitchell's investigation of Arctic haze in the 1950s found aerosol particles which apparently originated from industrial areas of Europe and China. Using studies of nuclear fallout from bomb tests which showed how aerosols moved in the upper atmosphere, he compared global temperature statistics with the record of volcanic eruptions in a 1961 paper which put forward his view that large eruptions had significantly affected temperatures at a hemispherical scale. Average temperatures had fallen since 1940 despite a lack of eruptions, and he thought this an "enigma" which might indicate a long term "rhythm" or cycle. In a seminal 1963 paper he analysed data from nearly 200 weather stations to show increasing temperatures from the start of the data in 1880 up to about 1940, followed by multidecadal cooling.

He continued his statistical investigations, and in a 1969 paper calculated that about two-thirds of Northern Hemisphere cooling since 1940 had been caused by a few recent volcanic eruptions, leading him to conclude that "man has been playing a very poor second fiddle to nature as a dust factory", though he thought that human influence could increase. In a 1971 paper he calculated that human caused aerosol emissions might result in global cooling after 2000 but depending on circumstances these emissions might cause a warming effect, indicating that humans had been "an innocent bystander" in the recent cooling. Calculations were too basic at this time to be trusted to give reliable results. As research developed, he drew attention to increasing evidence that warming climate, particularly in polar regions, was due to human caused greenhouse gas emissions and could change weather patterns to the detriment of agriculture.

== Later life and commemoration ==
In his later years he lived in McLean, Virginia. He suffered a long illness, and died at Georgetown University Hospital in Washington on October 5, 1990. In 1992 the Advisory Committee on Antarctic Names (US-ACAN) named the Mitchell Glacier after him.
