= Global cooling =

Discredited 1970s hypothesis of imminent cooling of the Earth

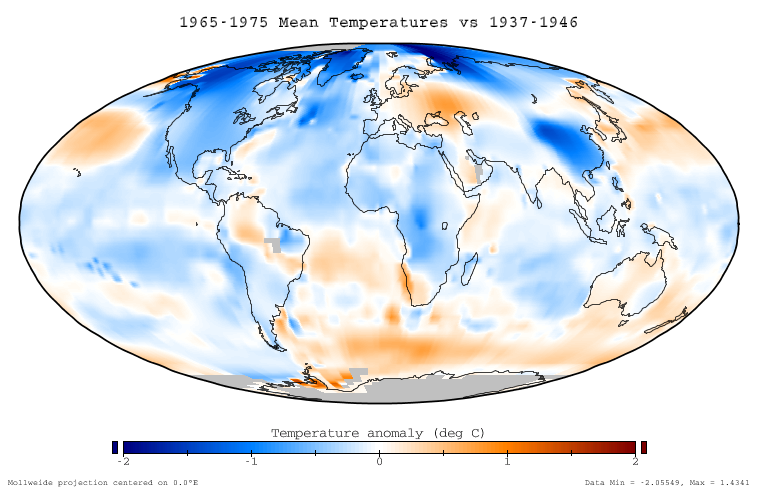
Mean temperature anomalies during the period 1965 to 1975 with respect to the average temperatures from 1937 to 1946. This dataset was not available at the time.

Anthropogenic global warming—not global cooling or "imminent ice ages"—dominated peer-reviewed literature in the 1970s, contrary to false claims that climate science subsequently reversed its consensus.

Global cooling was a conjecture, especially during the 1970s, of imminent cooling of the Earth culminating in a period of extensive glaciation, due to the cooling effects of aerosols or orbital forcing. Some press reports in the 1970s speculated about continued cooling; these did not accurately reflect the scientific literature of the time, which was generally more concerned with warming from an enhanced greenhouse effect.

An overall warming trend from the late Industrial Revolution did slow and reverse slightly from the 1940s to the 1970s due to high industrial emissions of sulfur-based aerosols, but then continued sharply upward into the 2020s.

== Introduction: general awareness and concern ==
By the 1970s, scientists were becoming increasingly aware that estimates of global temperatures showed cooling since 1945, as well as the possibility of large scale warming due to emissions of greenhouse gases. In the scientific papers which considered climate trends of the 21st century, fewer than 10% were inclined towards future cooling, while most papers predicted future warming. The general public had little awareness of carbon dioxide's effects on climate, but Science News in May 1959 forecast a 25% increase in atmospheric carbon dioxide in the 150 years from 1850 to 2000, with a consequent warming trend. The actual increase in this period was 29%. Paul R. Ehrlich mentioned global warming from greenhouse gases as a counterforce to the cooling effect of aerosols in 1968. By the time the idea of global cooling reached the public press in the mid-1970s temperatures had stopped falling, and there was concern in the climatological community about carbon dioxide's warming effects. In response to such reports, the World Meteorological Organization issued a warning in June 1976 that "a very significant warming of global climate" was probable.

Currently, there are some concerns about the possible regional cooling effects of a slowdown or shutdown of thermohaline circulation, which might be provoked by an increase of fresh water mixing into the North Atlantic due to glacial melting. The probability of this occurring is generally considered to be very low, and the IPCC notes, "even in models where the THC weakens, there is still warming over Europe. For example, in all AOGCM integrations where the radiative forcing is increasing, the sign of the temperature change over north-west Europe is positive."

== Physical mechanisms ==
The cooling period is reproduced by current (1999 on) global climate models that include the physical effects of sulfate aerosols, and there is now general agreement that aerosol effects were the dominant cause of the mid-20th century cooling. At the time there were two physical mechanisms that were most frequently advanced to cause cooling: aerosols and orbital forcing.

=== Aerosols ===
Human activity — mostly as a by-product of fossil fuel combustion, partly by land use changes — increases the number of tiny particles (aerosols) in the atmosphere. These have a direct effect: they effectively increase the planetary albedo, thus cooling the planet by reducing the solar radiation reaching the surface; and an indirect effect: they affect the properties of clouds by acting as cloud condensation nuclei. In the early 1970s some speculated that this cooling effect might dominate over the warming effect of the CO_{2} release: see discussion of Rasool and Schneider (1971), below. As a result of observations and a switch to cleaner fuel burning, this no longer seems likely; current scientific work indicates that global warming is far more likely. Although the temperature drops foreseen by this mechanism have now been discarded in light of better theory and the observed warming, aerosols are thought to have contributed a cooling tendency (outweighed by increases in greenhouse gases) and also have contributed to global dimming.

=== Orbital forcing ===
CO_{2}, temperature, and dust concentration measured by Petit et al. from Vostok ice core at Antarctica.

Orbital forcing refers to the slow, cyclical changes in the tilt of Earth's axis and shape of its orbit. These cycles alter the total amount of sunlight reaching the Earth by a small amount and affect the timing and intensity of the seasons. This mechanism is thought to be responsible for the timing of the ice age cycles, and understanding of the mechanism was increasing rapidly in the mid-1970s.

The paper of Hays, Imbrie, and Shackleton "Variations in the Earth's Orbit: Pacemaker of the Ice Ages" qualified its predictions with the remark that "forecasts must be qualified in two ways. First, they apply only to the natural component of future climatic trends - and not to anthropogenic effects such as those due to the burning of fossil fuels. Second, they describe only the long-term trends, because they are linked to orbital variations with periods of 20,000 years and longer. Climatic oscillations at higher frequencies are not predicted ... the results indicate that the long-term trend over the next 20,000 years is towards extensive Northern Hemisphere glaciation and cooler climate".

The idea that ice age cycles were predictable appears to have become conflated with the idea that another one was due "soon" - perhaps because much of this study was done by geologists, who are accustomed to dealing with very long time scales and use "soon" to refer to periods of thousands of years. A strict application of the Milankovitch theory does not allow the prediction of a "rapid" ice age onset (i.e., less than a century or two) since the fastest orbital period is about 20,000 years. Some creative ways around this were found, notably one championed by Nigel Calder under the name of "snowblitz", but these ideas did not gain wide acceptance.

The length of the current interglacial temperature peak is similar to the length of the preceding interglacial peak (Sangamon/Eem), and so it could be concluded that we might be nearing the end of this warm period. This conclusion would be mistaken. Firstly, because the lengths of previous interglacials were not particularly regular; see figure. Petit et al. note that "interglacials 5.5 and 9.3 are different from the Holocene, but similar to each other in duration, shape and amplitude. During each of these two events, there is a warm period of 4 kyr followed by a relatively rapid cooling". Secondly, future orbital variations will not closely resemble those of the past.

== Concern pre-1970s ==
In 1923, there was concern about a new ice age and Captain Donald Baxter MacMillan sailed toward the Arctic sponsored by the National Geographical Society to look for evidence of advancing glaciers.

In 1926, a Berlin astronomer was predicting global cooling but that it was "ages away".

Concerns that a new ice age was approaching was revived in the 1950s. During the Cold War, there were concerns by Harry Wexler that setting off atom bombs could be hastening a new ice age from a nuclear winter scenario.

J. Murray Mitchell showed as early as 1963 a multidecadal cooling since about 1940. At a conference on climate change held in Boulder, Colorado in 1965, evidence supporting Milankovitch cycles triggered speculation on how the calculated small changes in sunlight might somehow trigger ice ages. In 1966, Cesare Emiliani predicted that "a new glaciation will begin within a few thousand years." In his 1968 book The Population Bomb, Paul R. Ehrlich wrote "The greenhouse effect is being enhanced now by the greatly increased level of carbon dioxide ... [this] is being countered by low-level clouds generated by contrails, dust, and other contaminants ... At the moment we cannot predict what the overall climatic results will be of our using the atmosphere as a garbage dump."

== Concern in the 1970s ==
=== 1970s awareness ===
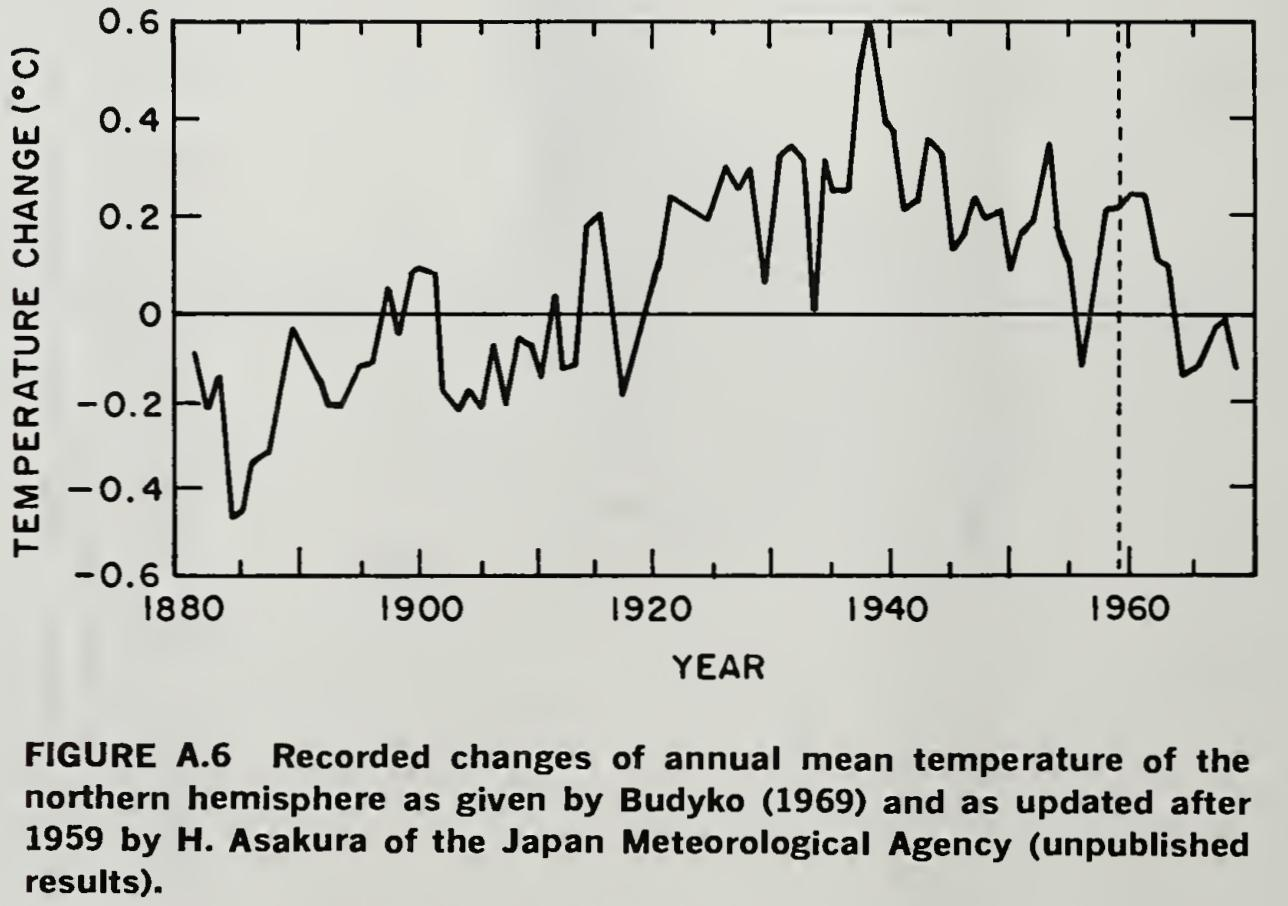
The temperature record as seen in 1975; compare with the next figure.

Global mean surface temperature change since 1880. Source: NASA GISS

Concern peaked in the early 1970s, though "the possibility of anthropogenic warming dominated the peer-reviewed literature even then" (a cooling period began in 1945, and two decades of a cooling trend suggested a trough had been reached after several decades of warming). This peaking concern is partially attributable to the fact much less was then known about world climate and causes of ice ages. Climate scientists were aware that predictions based on this trend were not possible - because the trend was poorly studied and not understood. Despite that, in the popular press the possibility of cooling was reported generally without the caveats present in the scientific reports, and "unusually severe winters in Asia and parts of North America in 1972 and 1973 ... pushed the issue into the public consciousness".

In the 1970s, the compilation of records to produce hemispheric, or global, temperature records had just begun.

Spencer R. Weart's history of The Discovery of Global Warming says that: "While neither scientists nor the public could be sure in the 1970s whether the world was warming or cooling, people were increasingly inclined to believe that global climate was on the move, and in no small way" [emphasis added].

On January 11, 1970, The Washington Post reported that "Colder Winters Held Dawn of New Ice Age".

In 1972, Emiliani warned "Man's activity may either precipitate this new ice age or lead to substantial or even total melting of the ice caps".

Also in 1972, a group of glacial-epoch experts at a conference agreed that "the natural end of our warm epoch is undoubtedly near"; but the volume of Quaternary Research reporting on the meeting said that "the basic conclusion to be drawn from the discussions in this section is that the knowledge necessary for understanding the mechanism of climate change is still lamentably inadequate". George Kukla and Robert Matthews, in a Science write-up of a conference, asked when and how the current interglacial would end; concluding that, unless there were impacts from future human activity, "Global cooling and related rapid changes of environment, substantially exceeding the fluctuations experienced by man in historical times, must be expected within the next few millennia or even centuries", but many other scientists doubted these conclusions.

=== 1970 SCEP report ===
The 1970 Study of Critical Environmental Problems reported the possibility of warming from increased carbon dioxide, but no concerns about cooling, setting a lower bound on the beginning of interest in "global cooling".

=== 1971 to 1975: papers on warming and cooling factors ===
By 1971, studies indicated that human caused air pollution was spreading, but there was uncertainty as to whether aerosols would cause warming or cooling, and whether or not they were more significant than rising CO_{2} levels. J. Murray Mitchell still viewed humans as "innocent bystanders" in the cooling from the 1940s to 1970, but in 1971 his calculations suggested that rising emissions could cause significant cooling after 2000, though he also argued that emissions could cause warming depending on circumstances. Calculations were too basic at this time to be trusted to give reliable results.

An early numerical computation of climate effects was published in the journal Science in July 1971 as a paper by S. Ichtiaque Rasool and Stephen H. Schneider, titled "Atmospheric Carbon Dioxide and Aerosols: Effects of Large Increases on Global Climate". The paper used rudimentary data and equations to compute the possible future effects of large increases in the densities in the atmosphere of two types of human environmental emissions:

1. greenhouse gases such as carbon dioxide;
2. particulate pollution such as smog, some of which remains suspended in the atmosphere in aerosol form for years.

The paper suggested that the global warming due to greenhouse gases would tend to have less effect with greater densities, and while aerosol pollution could cause warming, it was likely that it would tend to have a cooling effect which increased with density. They concluded that "An increase by only a factor of 4 in global aerosol background concentration may be sufficient to reduce the surface temperature by as much as 3.5 ° K. If sustained over a period of several years, such a temperature decrease over the whole globe is believed to be sufficient to trigger an ice age."

Both their equations and their data were badly flawed, as was soon pointed out by other scientists and confirmed by Schneider himself. In January 1972, Robert Jay Charlson et al. pointed out that with other reasonable assumptions, the model produced the opposite conclusion. The model made no allowance for changes in clouds or convection, and erroneously indicated that eight times as much CO_{2} would only cause 2 °C of warming. In a paper published in 1975, Schneider corrected the overestimate of aerosol cooling by checking data on the effects of dust produced by volcanoes. When the model included estimated changes in solar intensity, it gave a reasonable match to temperatures over the previous thousand years and its prediction was that "CO_{2} warming dominates the surface temperature patterns soon after 1980."

=== 1972 and 1974 National Science Board ===
The National Science Board's Patterns and Perspectives in Environmental Science report of 1972 discussed the cyclical behavior of climate, and the understanding at the time that the planet was entering a phase of cooling after a warm period. "Judging from the record of the past interglacial ages, the present time of high temperatures should be drawing to an end, to be followed by a long period of considerably colder temperatures leading into the next glacial age some 20,000 years from now." But it also continued; "However, it is possible, or even likely, that human interference has already altered the environment so much that the climatic pattern of the near future will follow a different path."

The board's report of 1974, Science And The Challenges Ahead, continued on this theme. "During the last 20-30 years, world temperature has fallen, irregularly at first but more sharply over the last decade." Discussion of cyclic glacial periods does not feature in this report. Instead it is the role of humans that is central to the report's analysis. "The cause of the cooling trend is not known with certainty. But there is increasing concern that man himself may be implicated, not only in the recent cooling trend but also in the warming temperatures over the last century". The report did not conclude whether carbon dioxide in warming, or agricultural and industrial pollution in cooling, are factors in the recent climatic changes, noting; "Before such questions as these can be resolved, major advances must be made in understanding the chemistry and physics of the atmosphere and oceans, and in measuring and tracing particulates through the system."

=== 1975 National Academy of Sciences report ===
There also was a Report by the U.S. National Academy of Sciences (NAS) entitled, "Understanding Climate Change: A Program for Action".

The report stated (p. 36) that, "The average surface air temperature in the northern hemisphere increased from the 1880s until about 1940 and has been decreasing thereafter."

It also stated (p. 44) that, "If both the CO_{2} and particulate inputs to the atmosphere grow at equal rates in the future, the widely differing atmospheric residence times of the two pollutants means that the particulate effect will grow in importance relative to that of CO_{2}."

The report did not predict whether the 25-year cooling trend would continue. It stated (Forward, p. v) that, "we do not have a good quantitative understanding of our climate machine and what determines its course [so] it does not seem possible to predict climate", and (p. 2) "The climates of the earth have always been changing, and they will doubtless continue to do so in the future. How large these future changes will be, and where and how rapidly they will occur, we do not know."

The Report's "program for action" was a call for creation of a new National Climatic Research Program. It stated (p. 62), "If we are to react rationally to the inevitable climatic changes of the future, and if we are ever to predict their future course, whether they are natural or man-induced, a far greater understanding of these changes is required than we now possess. It is, moreover, important that this knowledge be acquired as soon as possible." For that reason, it stated, "the time has now come to initiate a broad and coordinated attack on the problem of climate and climatic change."

=== 1974 Time magazine article ===
While these discussions were ongoing in scientific circles, other accounts appeared in the popular media. In their June 24, 1974, issue, Time presented an article titled "Another Ice Age?" that noted "the atmosphere has been growing gradually cooler for the past three decades" but noted that "Some scientists ... think that the cooling trend may be only temporary."

=== 1975 Newsweek article ===
An April 28, 1975, article in Newsweek magazine was titled "The Cooling World", it pointed to "ominous signs that the Earth's weather patterns have begun to change" and pointed to "a drop of half a degree [Fahrenheit] in average ground temperatures in the Northern Hemisphere between 1945 and 1968." The article stated "The evidence in support of these predictions [of global cooling] has now begun to accumulate so massively that meteorologists are hard-pressed to keep up with it." The Newsweek article did not state the cause of cooling; it stated that "what causes the onset of major and minor ice ages remains a mystery" and cited the NAS conclusion that "not only are the basic scientific questions largely unanswered, but in many cases we do not yet know enough to pose the key questions."

The article mentioned the alternative solutions of "melting the Arctic ice cap by covering it with black soot or diverting Arctic rivers" but conceded these were not feasible. The Newsweek article concluded by criticizing government leaders: "But the scientists see few signs that government leaders anywhere are even prepared to take the simple measures of stockpiling food or of introducing the variables of climatic uncertainty into economic projections of future food supplies ... The longer the planners (politicians) delay, the more difficult will they find it to cope with climatic change once the results become grim reality." The article emphasized sensational and largely unsourced consequences - "resulting famines could be catastrophic", "drought and desolation", "the most devastating outbreak of tornadoes ever recorded", "droughts, floods, extended dry spells, long freezes, delayed monsoons", "impossible for starving peoples to migrate", "the present decline has taken the planet about a sixth of the way toward the Ice Age."

On October 23, 2006, Newsweek issued a correction, over 31 years after the original article, stating that it had been "so spectacularly wrong about the near-term future" (though editor Jerry Adler stated that "the story wasn't 'wrong' in the journalistic sense of 'inaccurate.'")

=== Other 1970s sources ===
Academic analysis of the peer-reviewed studies published at that time shows that most papers examining aspects of climate during the 1970s were either neutral or showed a warming trend.

In 1977, a popular book on the topic was published, called The Weather Conspiracy: The Coming of the New Ice Age.

=== 1979 WMO conference ===
Later in the decade, at a WMO conference in 1979, F. Kenneth Hare reported:

Fig 8 shows ... 1938 the warmest year. They [temperatures] have since fallen by about 0.4 °C. At the end there is a suggestion that the fall ceased in about 1964, and may even have reversed.

Figure 9 challenges the view that the fall of temperature has ceased ... the weight of evidence clearly favours cooling to the present date ... The striking point, however, is that interannual variability of world temperatures is much larger than the trend ... it is difficult to detect a genuine trend

It is questionable, moreover, whether the trend is truly global. Calculated variations in the 5-year mean air temperature over the southern hemisphere chiefly with respect to land areas show that temperatures generally rose between 1943 and 1975. Since the 1960-64 period this rise has been strong ... the scattered SH data fail to support a hypothesis of continued global cooling since 1938. [p 65]

== Late-20th-century cooling predictions ==
=== 1980s ===
Concerns about nuclear winter arose in the early 1980s from several reports. Similar speculations have appeared over effects due to catastrophes such as asteroid impacts and massive volcanic eruptions.

=== 1990s ===
In 1991, a prediction by Carl Sagan and other scientists who had worked on the famous TTAPS study on nuclear winter that massive oil well fires in Kuwait would cause significant effects on climate was incorrect.

In January 1999, contrarian Patrick Michaels wrote a commentary offering to "take even money that the 10 years ending on December 31, 2007, will show a statistically significant global cooling trend in temperatures measured by satellite", on the basis of his view that record temperatures in 1998 had been a blip. Indeed, over that period, satellite-measured temperatures never again approached their 1998 peak. Due to a sharp but temporary dip in temperatures in 1999–2000, a least-squares linear regression fit to the satellite temperature record showed little overall trend. The RSS satellite temperature record showed a slight cooling trend, but the UAH satellite temperature record showed a slight warming trend.

== Twenty-first century ==
In 2003, the Office of Net Assessment at the United States Department of Defense was commissioned to produce a study on the likely and potential effects of abrupt modern climate change should a shutdown of thermohaline circulation occur. The study, conducted under ONA head Andrew Marshall, modelled its prospective climate change on the 8.2 kiloyear event, precisely because it was the middle alternative between the Younger Dryas and the Little Ice Age. Scientists said that "abrupt climate change initiated by Greenland ice sheet melting is not a realistic scenario for the 21st century".

== Present level of knowledge ==
The concern that cooler temperatures would continue, and perhaps at a faster rate, has been observed to be incorrect, as was assessed in the IPCC Third Assessment Report of 2001. More has to be learned about climate. However, the growing records have shown that short term cooling concerns have not been borne out.

As for the prospects of the end of the current interglacial, while the four most recent interglacials lasted about 10,000 years, the interglacial before that lasted around 28,000 years. Milankovitch-type calculations indicate that the present interglacial would probably continue for tens of thousands of years naturally in the absence of human perturbations. Other estimates (Loutre and Berger, based on orbital calculations) put the unperturbed length of the present interglacial at 50,000 years. A. Berger expressed the opinion in 2005 (EGU presentation) that the present CO_{2} perturbation will last long enough to suppress the next glacial cycle entirely. This is consistent with the prediction of David Archer and colleagues who argued in 2005 that the present level of CO_{2} will suspend the next glacial period for the next 500,000 years and will be the longest duration and intensity of the projected interglacial period and are longer than have been seen in the last 2.6 million years.

A 2015 report by the Past Global Changes Project, including Berger, says simulations show that a new glaciation is unlikely to happen within the next approximately 50,000 years, before the next strong drop in Northern Hemisphere summer insolation occurs "if either atmospheric CO_{2} concentration remains above 300 ppm or cumulative carbon emissions exceed 1000 Pg C" (i.e. 1000 gigatonnes carbon). "Only for an atmospheric CO_{2} content below the preindustrial level may a glaciation occur within the next 10 ka. ... Given the continued anthropogenic CO_{2} emissions, glacial inception is very unlikely to occur in the next 50 ka, because the timescale for CO_{2} and temperature reduction toward unperturbed values in the absence of active removal is very long [IPCC, 2013], and only weak precessional forcing occurs in the next two precessional cycles." (A precessional cycle is around 21,000 years, the time it takes for the perihelion to move all the way around the tropical year.)

As the NAS report indicates, scientific knowledge regarding climate change was more uncertain than it is today. At the time that Rasool and Schneider wrote their 1971 paper, climatologists had not yet recognized the significance of greenhouse gases other than water vapor and carbon dioxide, such as methane, nitrous oxide, and chlorofluorocarbons. Early in that decade, carbon dioxide was the only widely studied human-influenced greenhouse gas. The attention drawn to atmospheric gases in the 1970s stimulated many discoveries in subsequent decades. As the temperature pattern changed, global cooling was of waning interest by 1979.

== The ice age fallacy ==
A common argument used to dismiss the significance of human-caused climate change is to allege that scientists showed concerns about global cooling which did not materialise, and there is therefore no need to heed current scientific concerns about global warming. In a 1998 article promoting the Oregon Petition, Fred Singer argued that expert concerns about global warming should be dismissed on the basis that what he called "the same hysterical fears" had supposedly been expressed earlier about global cooling.

Bryan Walsh of Time magazine (2013) calls this argument "the Ice Age Fallacy". Illustrating the argument, for several years an image had been circulated of a Time cover, supposedly dated 1977, showing a penguin above a cover story titled "How to Survive the Coming Ice Age". In March 2013, The Mail on Sunday published an article by David Rose, showing this same cover image, to support his claim that there was as much concern in the 1970s about a "looming 'ice age'" as there was now about global warming. After researching the authenticity of the magazine cover image, in July 2013, Walsh confirmed that the image was a hoax, modified from a 2007 cover story image for "The Global Warming Survival Guide".

== See also ==
- Anti-greenhouse effect
- Global dimming
- Land surface effects on climate
- Global warming
- History of climate change science
- Volcanic winter
- Next glacial maximum
- The Day After Tomorrow
- Ice age
