= Eugene M. Wescott =

Eugene Michael "Gene" Wescott (February 15, 1932 – February 23, 2014) was an American scientist, artist, and traditional dancer. He was born in Hampton, Iowa, and moved to North Hollywood, California at the age of 10, where he later attended North Hollywood High School and Valley Junior College. He graduated from UCLA and moved to Alaska in 1958, attending the University of Alaska Fairbanks, where he obtained his PhD in 1960.

== Scientific career ==
Wescott worked at the Geophysical Institute of the University of Alaska Fairbanks from 1958 to 2009, through two International Polar Years. He was appointed Professor Emeritus of Geophysics, and had an extensive background of research in solid earth geophysics and space physics. He was involved directly in auroral and magnetospheric electric field studies and plasma physics experiments using barium and calcium plasma rocket injections at Poker Flat Research Range. He and Drs. David Sentman and Daniel Osborne proved the existence of red sprites and blue jets, upper-atmospheric electrical phenomena.

== Personal and artistic life ==
Wescott was an avid mountain climber, and together with Charles Deehr, Jon Gardey, and Finley Kennel made the first ascent of Mt. Redoubt in August 1959. He also was among the first teams to climb Old Snowy, Black Cap, Aurora and Meteor peaks in the Alaska Range. He also made the first winter ascent of Institute Peak in 1960.
