= Journal of Applied Meteorology and Climatology =

- January 2006 cover
- Discipline: Meteorology and Climatology
- Language: English
- Edited by: David A. R. Kristovich

Publication details
- Former name: Journal of Applied Meteorology
- History: 1962–present
- Publisher: American Meteorological Society (U.S.A)
- Frequency: Monthly
- Open access: Delayed, 1 year
- Impact factor: 2.923 (2020)

Standard abbreviations
- ISO 4: J. Appl. Meteorol. Climatol.

Indexing
- ISSN: 1558-8424 (print); 1558-8432 (web)

Links
- Journal homepage; Archive

The Journal of Applied Meteorology and Climatology (JAMC; formerly Journal of Applied Meteorology) is a scientific journal published by the American Meteorological Society. Applied research related to the physical meteorology, cloud physics, hydrology, weather modification, satellite meteorology, boundary layer processes, air pollution meteorology (including dispersion and chemical processes), agricultural and forest meteorology, and applied meteorological numerical models of all types.

== See also ==
- List of scientific journals
  - List of scientific journals in earth and atmospheric sciences
