= Erin Pettit =

American glaciologist

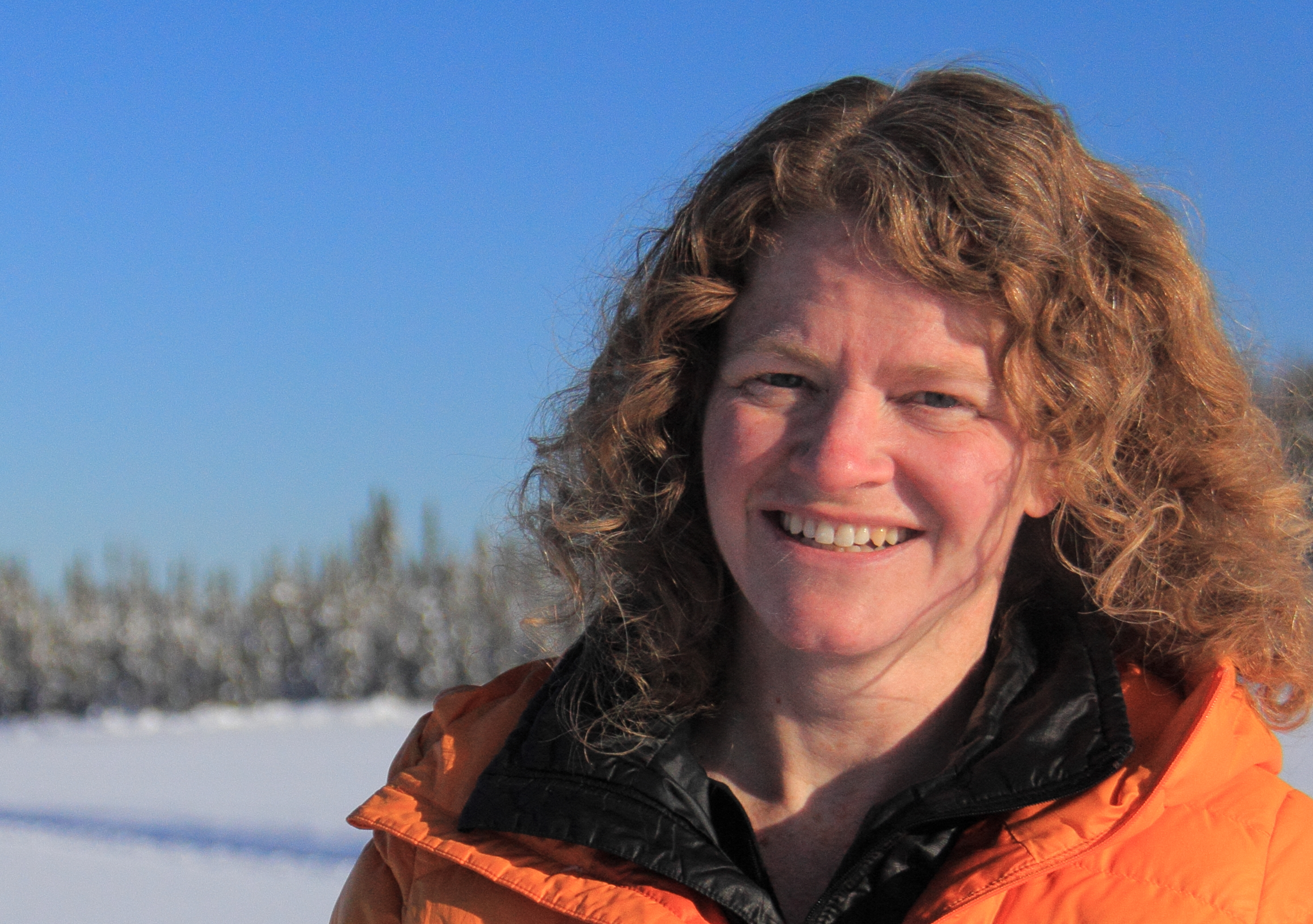
- Born: 1971 (age 54–55)
- Education: Brown University; University of Washington
- Scientific career
- Fields: Glaciology; Geophysics
- Workplaces: University of Alaska; Oregon State University
- Website: www.exploreice.org

Erin Christine Pettit (born 1971) is an American glaciologist focusing on climate change. She is an associate professor of geophysics and glaciology at Oregon State University. Her work focuses on ice-ocean interactions, ice-shelf disintegration, sea-level rise and ocean circulation changes.

== Early life and education ==
Pettit, born in 1971, is originally from Seattle, Washington. She started her academic career pursuing an Sc.B. in mechanical engineering at Brown University, which she received in 1994. Before she attended graduate school, she lived in Los Angeles where she worked at AeroVironment and volunteered for the Sierra Club. She then went on to earn her Ph.D. in Geophysics from the University of Washington in 2003, where her dissertation focused on the dynamic behavior of ice divides. Pettit also worked as a postdoctoral research fellow at UW until 2006 and then became a research physical scientist at the Cold Regions Research and Engineering Lab in New Hampshire. Pettit was faculty at the University of Alaska, Fairbanks (UAF) from 2008 through 2018. She is currently an associate professor in the College of Earth, Ocean and Atmospheric Sciences at Oregon State University.

== Career and impact ==
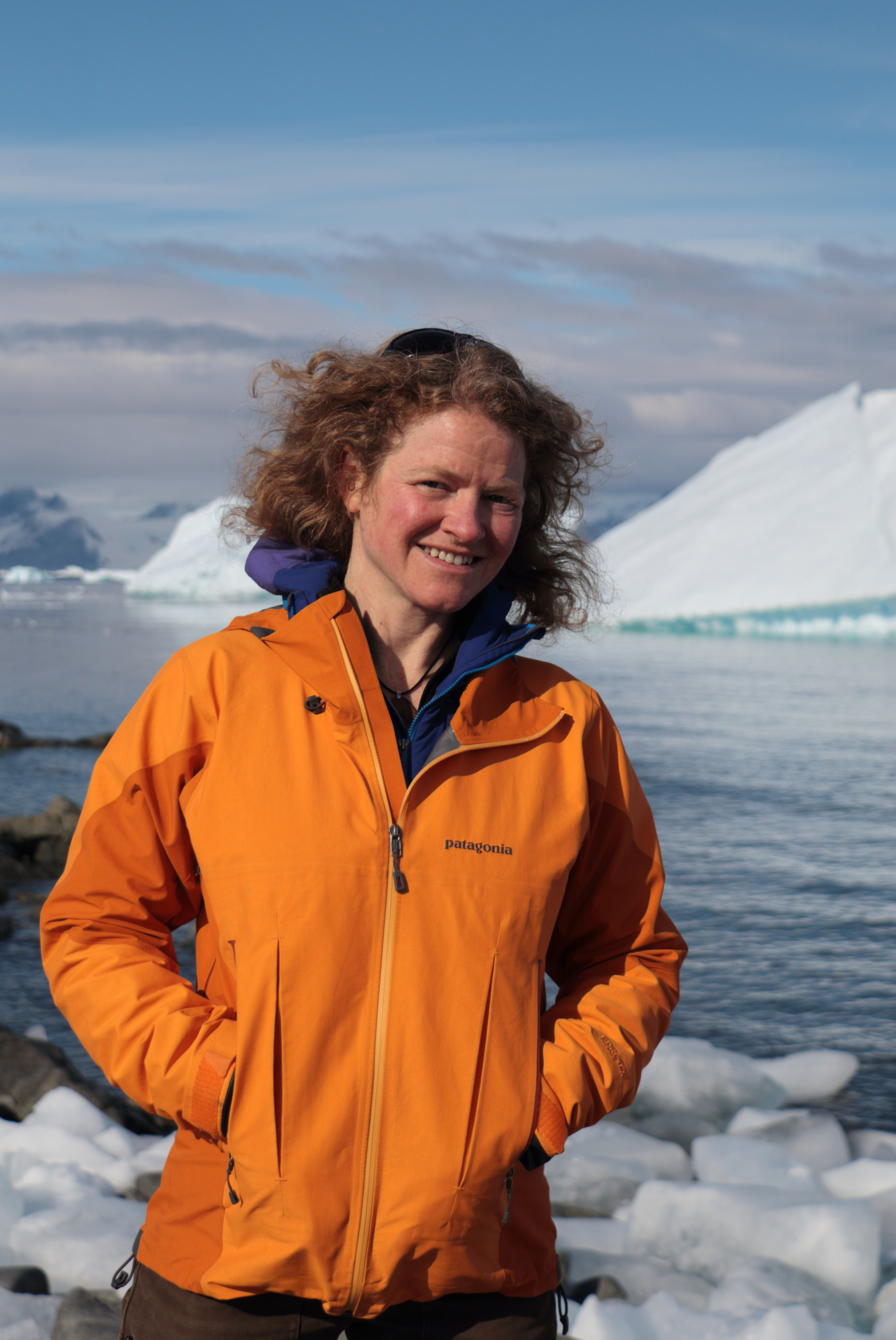
Pettit at Rothera station

Pettit's research is primarily focused on glacial dynamics and exploring the interactions within the ice-ocean-earth system. Pettit is a National Geographic Emerging Explorer who innovated applying acoustic research with hydrophones to calving and melting glaciers reaching the ocean, to examine ice shelf disintegration and the ice-ocean boundary. Her work has been recognized by numerous high-profile sources, including EARTH magazine, and National Geographic, and she was invited to present a TEDWomen talk, on her investigations focused on "listening" to glaciers. Her research on glacier sounds extends to how the underwater noise affects marine animals. She also founded Inspiring Girls Expeditions, a series of interdisciplinary wilderness science programs that teach high school girls about glaciology, oceanography, ecology, and mountaineering. The first program, Girls on Ice, started in Washington in 1999, with Pettit taking five girls to the South Cascade Glacier. During the program, adolescent girls learn mountaineering skills, how to use GPS for glacier measurement and how to calculate the velocity of streams.

== Awards and honors ==
Pettit has received numerous awards including the National Science Foundation (NSF) Geoscience El Niño RAPID Award (2016), the Inspiring Women in STEM award, Insight into Diversity (2015), the WINGS WorldQuest Earth Award (2007), the David A. Johnston Memorial Scholarship Award (2000) as well as the UW Graduate School Merit Award (1997–1998). Pettit received the UAF Teaching Award (2012) from the UAF College of Natural Sciences and Mathematics as well as a Merit Award for Research Excellence and Coordination for the Girls on Ice Program she initiated (2011). The Girls on Ice program takes American teenage girls to Alaska and Washington State where they appreciate the climate and the experts who study it.

She became a National Geographic Emerging Explorer in 2013. She was appointed as a U.S. representative to the international Scientific Committee on Antarctic Research in 2016 and as a representative for the U.S. Department of State Brazil-U.S. Women in Science Program (2011). Pettit received the National Science Foundation Graduate Research Fellowship (1998–2003) and the Fannie and John Hertz Foundation Research Fellowship Grant (1997).
