= List of Guggenheim Fellowships awarded in 1954 =

Two hundred and forty-three Guggenheim Fellowships were awarded in 1954. More than $1,000,000 was disbursed.

== 1954 U.S. and Canadian Fellows ==
Category	Field of Study	Fellow	Institutional association	Research topic	Notes	Ref
Creative Arts	Choreography	Merce Cunningham			Also won in 1959	
Creative Arts	Fiction	Stephen Becker		Writing		
Creative Arts	Fiction	Julius Horwitz		Book about Israel	Also won in 1965	
Creative Arts	Fiction	Virginia Sorensen		Book about Danish Mormon immigrants to Utah	Also won in 1946	
Creative Arts	Fine Arts	Kenneth Callahan		Painting		
Creative Arts	Fine Arts	Naum Gabo		Kinetic constructions		
Creative Arts	Fine Arts	Edward L. Haber				
Creative Arts	Fine Arts	Joseph Lasker	University of Illinois	Painting		
Creative Arts	Fine Arts	Harold Paris			Also won in 1953	
Creative Arts	Fine Arts	Bernard Perlin		Painting	Also won in 1959	
Creative Arts	Fine Arts	Henry Rox	Mount Holyoke College	Sculpture		
Creative Arts	Fine Arts	John Williams Taylor				
Creative Arts	Music Composition	Louis Calabro		Composing	Also won in 1959	
Creative Arts	Music Composition	Lou Silver Harrison		Composing	Also won in 1952	
Creative Arts	Music Composition	Alan Hovhaness		Composing	Also won in 1953	
Creative Arts	Music Composition	Hunter Johnson		Composing	Also won in 1941	
Creative Arts	Music Composition	Benjamin George Lees		Composing	Also won in 1966	
Creative Arts	Music Composition	Julia Amanda Perry		Composing	Also won in 1956	
Creative Arts	Music Composition	Robert L. Sanders		Composing		
Creative Arts	Music Composition	Eugene Herbert Weigel	University of Illinois	Composing		
Creative Arts	Photography	Wright Morris			Also won in 1942 and 1946	
Creative Arts	Photography	John Szarkowski		The Idea of Louis Sullivan (published 1956)	Also won in 1961	
Creative Arts	Poetry	Jorge Guillén	Wellesley College	Clamor (published 1957)	Also won in 1959	
Creative Arts	Poetry	Anthony Evan Hecht	Bard College	Writing	Also won in 1959	
Creative Arts	Poetry	May Sarton		Writing		
Creative Arts	Poetry	Peter R. Viereck	Mount Holyoke College	Intellectual history, especially of 19th-century England	Also won in 1948	
Humanities	American History	Carl Julius Bode	University of Maryland	Mid-19th century American culture		
Humanities	American Literature	Edwin H. Cady	Syracuse University	William Dean Howells	Also won in 1975	
Humanities	American Literature	David Howard Dickason	Indiana University	Interrelations of American literature and the plastic arts in the 19th century		
Humanities	American Literature	Andrew Reuben Hilen, Jr.				
Humanities	Architecture, Planning and Design	Kenneth John Conant	Harvard University	Romanesque Cluny Abbey and monastery	Also won in 1926, 1928, 1929, and 1930	
Humanities	Biography	Mary Wells Knight Ashworth		Finished the sixth and wrote the seventh volumes of Douglas Freeman's biography of George Washington		
Humanities	Biography	Samuel Flagg Bemis	Yale University	John Quincy Adams	Also won in 1960	
Humanities	British History	Margaret Atwood Judson	New Jersey College for Women	History of thought in England, 1640-1660		
Humanities	British History	Russell Amos Kirk		Recent changes in traditional British society		
Humanities	British History	Arthur Maheux	Laval University	Lumber, pulp, and paper industries of Canada		
Humanities	British History	Conyers Read		William Cecil, Lord Burghley	Also won in 1951	
Humanities	Classics	Milton V. Anastos	Harvard University	Intellectual history of the age of Emperor Justinian I	Also won in 1966	
Humanities	Classics	Truesdell Sparhawk Brown	University of California, Los Angeles	Hellenistic historiography		
Humanities	Classics	Evelyn Byrd Harrison	American School of Classical Studies	Ancient Greek stone sculpture in Athens		
Humanities	Classics	Jakob Aall Ottesen Larsen	University of California	Greek federal states		
Humanities	Classics	Berthe Marie Marti	Bryn Mawr College	Medieval intepretations of the Roman stoic writers		
Humanities	Classics	Ben Edwin Perry	University of Illinois	Ancient Greek and Roman fables	Also won in 1930	
Humanities	Drama and Performing Arts	W. Denis Johnston	Mount Holyoke College	Jonathan Swift and his circle, and the writing of a play on that theme		
Humanities	East Asian Studies	James Irving Crump	University of Michigan	Chinese fiction		
Humanities	East Asian Studies	Stanley K. Hornbeck				
Humanities	Economic History	Rondo Emmett Cameron	University of Wisconsin	European economic history	Also won in 1969	
Humanities	English Literature	Ralph Cohen	University of California, Los Angeles	English philosophy and literary theory in the 18th century		
Humanities	English Literature	David V. Erdman	University of Minnesota	Literary and social history of the romantic period in English literature		
Humanities	English Literature	Charlton Hinman	Johns Hopkins University	The text of Shakespeare's plays	Also won in 1953	
Humanities	English Literature	Samuel Frederick Johnson				
Humanities	English Literature	Ada Nisbet	University of California, Los Angeles	Charles Dickens and his relations with America	Also won in 1948	
Humanities	English Literature	Arthur H. Scouten	University of Pennsylvania	History of the London State, 1660-1800		
Humanities	English Literature	Ernest Albert Strathmann	Pomona College	Prose words of Walter Raleigh	Also won in 1946	
Humanities	English Literature	Edward Surtz	Loyola University Chicago	Intellectual milieu of Thomas More's Utopia		
Humanities	Fine Arts Research	Richard Bernheimer	Bryn Mawr College	Italian sources of architectural Romanticism		
Humanities	Fine Arts Research	Jane Costello	New York University	Poussin		
Humanities	Fine Arts Research	Sydney Joseph Freedberg	Wellesley College	High Renaissance style in Roman and Florentine painting	Also won in 1949	
Humanities	Fine Arts Research	Frederick Hartt	Washington University in St. Louis	Art of Andrea del Castagno	Also won in 1946	
Humanities	Fine Arts Research	Charles Seymour, Jr.	Yale University	15th-century Italian Renaissance sculpture		
Humanities	Fine Arts Research	Paul Stover Wingert				
Humanities	Fine Arts Research	Adja Yunkers			Also won in 1949	
Humanities	Folklore and Popular Culture	Marius Barbeau		French folk songs of North America	Also won in 1956	
Humanities	French History	Arthur Layton Funk	University of Florida	Research in France		
Humanities	French History	Louis R. Gottschalk	University of Chicago	Lafayette in the French Revolution	Also won in 1928	
Humanities	French Literature	Victor H. Brombert	Yale University	The intellectual as a tragic hero in the contemporary French novel	Also won in 1969	
Humanities	French Literature	Lester G. Crocker	Goucher College	18th-century European ethical thought		
Humanities	French Literature	Nathan Edelman				
Humanities	French Literature	Norman Lewis Torrey	Columbia University		Also won in 1932	
Humanities	General Nonfiction	James Baldwin				
Humanities	General Nonfiction	Marguerite Higgins		Communist tactics in international negotiation		
Humanities	General Nonfiction	Oscar W. Koch		Military intelligence in combat, its processes, techniques, and methods under actual battle conditions		
Humanities	General Nonfiction	David T. W. McCord	Harvard College Fund	Edward Lear		
Humanities	General Nonfiction	John Edward Pfeiffer		Recent theories of structure and evolution of the universe	Also won in 1952	
Humanities	German and East European History	Hajo Holborn	Yale University	History of Germany since 1500	Also won in 1961	
Humanities	German and East European History	Arthur May	University of Rochester	History of the Hapsburg monarchy, 1914-1920		
Humanities	German and Scandinavian Literature	Stuart P. Atkins	Harvard University	Development of popular moral and religious prose literature in 16th-century Germany	Also won in 1968	
Humanities	German and Scandinavian Literature	Bernhard Blume	Ohio State University	Symbolism in German poetry	Also won in 1963	
Humanities	German and Scandinavian Literature	Heinrich Edmund Karl Henel	University of Wisconsin	History of German poetry, 1819-1928	Also won in 1951	
Humanities	German and Scandinavian Literature	Jack Madison Stein	Columbia University	Synthesis of art as developed by Richard Wagner	Also won in 1962	
Humanities	German and Scandinavian Literature	Hermann J. Weigand	Yale University	German literature		
Humanities	History of Science and Technology	Carl Benjamin Boyer	Brooklyn College			
Humanities	History of Science and Technology	Charles Coulston Gillispie	Princeton University	French science	Also won in 1970	
Humanities	History of Science and Technology	Thomas S. Kuhn	Harvard University	Sources and preconditions of scientific conceptualization		
Humanities	Intellectual and Cultural History	Carl Emil Schorske	Wesleyan College	Emergence of characteristic 20th-century modes of thought in the period 1890-1914		
Humanities	Italian Literature	Ernst Pulgram	University of Michigan	Linguistic history of Italy	Also won in 1962	
Humanities	Italian Literature	Charles S. Singleton	Harvard University	Poetry of Dante's Divine Comedy	Also won in 1950 and 1962	
Humanities	Linguistics	Yuen Ren Chao	University of California		Also won in 1968	
Humanities	Linguistics	Mark J. Dresden	University of Pennsylvania	Grammar of the Khotanese language	Also won in 1956	
Humanities	Linguistics	Joseph Harold Greenberg			Also won in 1982	
Humanities	Literary Criticism	Mary Ethel Dichmann	Southwestern Louisiana Institute	Literary relationship of William Wordsworth, Matthew Arnold, and T. S. Eliot		
Humanities	Literary Criticism	Samuel Holt Monk	University of Minnesota	Literary criticism in restoration England		
Humanities	Literary Criticism	Lewis Pearson Simpson	Louisiana State University	Symbolic significance of the idea of the "republic of letters"		
Humanities	Medieval History	Bryce Lyon	Harvard University	Administrative institutions of medieval Western Europe	Also won in 1972	
Humanities	Medieval Literature	Cora Elizabeth Lutz	Wilson College	Education in the Middle Ages	Also won in 1949	
Humanities	Medieval Literature	Robert Armstrong Pratt	University of North Carolina	Development of moral ideas in the Middle Ages	Also won in 1946	
Humanities	Music Research	David Dodge Boyden	University of California		Also won in 1966 and 1970	
Humanities	Music Research	William Loran Crosten	Stanford University	Historical studies in the aesthetics and dramaturgy of opera		
Humanities	Music Research	Eta Harich-Schneider			Also won in 1953 and 1955	
Humanities	Music Research	Paul Henry Lang				
Humanities	Music Research	Kenneth Levy	Princeton University	French secular music of the 16th century		
Humanities	Music Research	Frederick William Sternfeld	Dartmouth College	Film music		
Humanities	Near Eastern Studies	Theodor Herzl Gaster	Dropsie College	Samaritans	Also won in 1959	
Humanities	Near Eastern Studies	Ann Perkins	Yale University	Archaeological history of Mesopotamia		
Humanities	Philosophy	Vianney Décarie	University of Montreal	Man's knowledge of God according to St. Thomas Aquinas		
Humanities	Philosophy	Mortimer R. Kadish	Western Reserve University	Considering science as part of modern cultural experience		
Humanities	Philosophy	Armand Augustine Maurer, Jr.	University of Toronto	Latin averroism in the later middle ages and its influence on the naturalism of the renaissance		
Humanities	Philosophy	Reidar Thomte	Concordia College	Existential categories in the philosophy of Søren Kierkegaard		
Humanities	Religion	Robert Friedmann	Western Michigan College	16th- and 17th-century Anabaptist Church history		
Humanities	Religion	Abraham Joshua Heschel	Jewish Theological Seminary of America			
Humanities	Renaissance History	Sears Reynolds Jayne	University of California		Also won in 1969	
Humanities	Renaissance History	Craig R. Thompson	Lawrence College		Also won in 1942, 1955, and 1968	
Humanities	Russian Studies	John Shelton Curtiss	Duke University	Russian Army under Nicholas I, 1825-1855		
Humanities	Slavic Literature	Elias Denissoff	University of Notre Dame	Interrelationships between Eastern and Western thought		
Humanities	Spanish and Portuguese Literature	Enrique Anderson Imbert	University of Michigan	History of Spanish language and history		
Humanities	Spanish and Portuguese Literature	Joaquín Casalduero			Also won in 1944	
Humanities	Spanish and Portuguese Literature	Juan Roura-Parella	Wesleyan College	Philosophy of Wilhelm Dilthey		
Humanities	United States History	Oscar Handlin	Harvard University	Influence of continuing settlement of the US upon social and cultural institutions		
Humanities	United States History	Henry Lumpkin	US Naval Academy	Ancient Greek naval power		
Humanities	United States History	John Francis McDermott	Washington University in St. Louis	Graphic artists' representations of the Middle West, 1790-1860		
Humanities	United States History	Walter Prescott Webb	University of Texas	History of the American West	Also won in 1938	
Humanities	United States History	Rubin Richard Wohl	University of Chicago	American literature, success, and its influence		
Natural Sciences	Applied Mathematics	Henry George Booker	Cornell University	Physics of the outer atmosphere		
Natural Sciences	Applied Mathematics	Harold Levine	Harvard University			
Natural Sciences	Applied Mathematics	Chia-Chiao Lin	Massachusetts Institute of Technology	Theoretical fluid dynamics	Also won in 1960	
Natural Sciences	Applied Mathematics	Milton Denman Van Dyke	Stanford University	Fluid mechanics		
Natural Sciences	Astronomy and Astrophysics	John Barrows Irwin	Indiana University	Light-curves of southern long period Cepheid variables		
Natural Sciences	Chemistry	Berni Julian Alder	University of California			
Natural Sciences	Chemistry	Fred Basolo	Northwestern University	Mechanisms of substitution reactions in complexions		
Natural Sciences	Chemistry	Donald James Cram	University of California, Los Angeles	Transannular effects in large ring compounds		
Natural Sciences	Chemistry	Paul J. Flory	Cornell University	High polymer theory in relation to biological systems		
Natural Sciences	Chemistry	Herbert Sander Gutowsky	University of Illinois	Radio frequency and microwave spectra in relation to the structure of matter		
Natural Sciences	Chemistry	Lester Guttman	University of Chicago	Structure of liquid metal solutions		
Natural Sciences	Chemistry	Donald Frederick Hornig	Brown University	Quantum theoretical studies of molecular structure		
Natural Sciences	Chemistry	David Newton Hume	Massachusetts Institute of Technology	Research in Denmark		
Natural Sciences	Chemistry	Walter McClellan Lauer	University of Minnesota	Mechanism of substitution in the aromatic unit of organic compounds		
Natural Sciences	Chemistry	Chester Thomas O'Konski	University of California			
Natural Sciences	Chemistry	George Claude Pimentel	University of California			
Natural Sciences	Chemistry	John D. Roberts	California Institute of Technology	Fixing of molecular nitrogen to establish chemical models of biochemical systems	Also won in 1952	
Natural Sciences	Chemistry	Max Tofield Rogers	Michigan State College	Molecular structure		
Natural Sciences	Chemistry	William Frederick Sager	George Washington University	Oxidation of organic systems by chronic acid and similar reagents		
Natural Sciences	Chemistry	Robert Lane Scott	University of California, Los Angeles	Nature of liquids and solutions, including those of high molecular weight		
Natural Sciences	Chemistry	Harrison Shull	Iowa State College	Spectral properties of substituted benzenes		
Natural Sciences	Chemistry	Walter H. Stockmayer	Massachusetts Institute of Technology	Dilute solutions of high polymers		
Natural Sciences	Chemistry	Charles Gardner Swain	Massachusetts Institute of Technology	Mechanisms of organics reactions and structures of organic molecules		
Natural Sciences	Chemistry	Stanley Gerald Thompson	University of California		Also won in 1965	
Natural Sciences	Chemistry	Geoffrey Wilkinson	Harvard University	Formation of inorganic complex compounds		
Natural Sciences	Chemistry	Mathew K. Wilson	Harvard University	Infrared spectra of small molecules		
Natural Sciences	Earth Science	Lloyd Arnold Brown	Peabody Institute Library	History of the mapping of America, 1492–present		
Natural Sciences	Earth Science	Kenneth Edward Caster	University of Cincinnati	Comparative studies of the Devonian period (age of fishes), fauna of South Africa and Brazil	Also won in 1943 and 1955	
Natural Sciences	Earth Science	John Wyatt Durham	University of California		Also won in 1965	
Natural Sciences	Earth Science	Albert E. J. Engel	California Institute of Technology	Sedimentary deposits in relation to early earth history		
Natural Sciences	Earth Science	Fritiof Melvin Fryxell	Augustana College	History of American geology and western exploration, especially the Hayden survey of 1867-1879		
Natural Sciences	Earth Science	Edward H. Graham	US Department of Agriculture	Comparative study of the use of land resources		
Natural Sciences	Earth Science	Cornelius Searle Hurlbut Jr.	Harvard University	Mineralogy of pegmatites		
Natural Sciences	Earth Science	Hans Jenny	University of California	Soil nitrogen and soil organic matter as related to climate and length and intensity of cultivation	Also won in 1942	
Natural Sciences	Earth Science	Peter H. Misch				
Natural Sciences	Earth Science	Bryan Patterson	University of Chicago	South American fossil vertebrates	Also won in 1951	
Natural Sciences	Earth Science	Joanne Starr Malkus	Woods Hole Oceanographic Institution	Atmospheric convection and cloud physics		
Natural Sciences	Earth Science	Herbert Edgar Wright, Jr.	University of Minnesota	Physical and climatic settings of early cultures in Iraq and adjacent areas		
Natural Sciences	Engineering	Neal Russell Amundson	University of Minnesota	Mathematical analysis and synthesis of the industrial chemical reactor	Also won in 1975	
Natural Sciences	Engineering	Joseph William Johnson				
Natural Sciences	Engineering	Osman Kamel Mawardi	Massachusetts Institute of Technology			
Natural Sciences	Engineering	Dennis Granville Shepherd	Cornell University	Combustion of liquid fuels in an air stream adjacent to a surface		
Natural Sciences	Engineering	Nelson Wax	University of Illinois	Nonlinear phenomena		
Natural Sciences	Engineering	Arthur Henry Waynick	Pennsylvania State University	Physics and chemistry of the lower ionosphere		
Natural Sciences	Mathematics	Douglas George Chapman				
Natural Sciences	Mathematics	Shiing-Shen Chern	University of Chicago	Differential geometry	Also won in 1966	
Natural Sciences	Mathematics	Magnus Rudolph Hestenes	University of California, Los Angeles	Theory of linear spaces in relation to the calculus of variations		
Natural Sciences	Mathematics	Ellis Robert Kolchin	Columbia University		Also won in 1961	
Natural Sciences	Mathematics	Friederich Ignaz Mautner	Johns Hopkins University	Unitary representations of locally compact topological groups and Fourier analysis on such groups		
Natural Sciences	Mathematics	Hans Rademacher	University of Pennsylvania	Theory of generalized modular functions belonging to the real quadratic fields		
Natural Sciences	Mathematics	Maxwell A. Rosenlicht	Northwestern University	Noncomplete algebraic group varieties		
Natural Sciences	Mathematics	Alexander Weinstein	University of Maryland	Initial boundary value problem for singular hyperbolic equations and for particular differential equations of mixed type	Also won in 1955	
Natural Sciences	Medicine and Health	Arpad Istvan Csapo	Johns Hopkins University Medical School and Carnegie Institute of Washington	Uterine muscle physiology and function		
Natural Sciences	Medicine and Health	Ladislas J. Meduna	University of Illinois	Biological substances with specific affinity to animal and human brain tissue		
Natural Sciences	Medicine and Health	Robert Oliver Scow	National Institute of Arthritis and Metabolic Diseases	Diabetes and endocrine physiology		
Natural Sciences	Medicine and Health	Julian Tobias	University of Chicago	Cellular neurophysiology		
Natural Sciences	Molecular and Cellular Biology	Werner Bergmann	Yale University	Organic chemistry and development of invertebrates		
Natural Sciences	Molecular and Cellular Biology	Robert Harza Burris	University of Wisconsin	Biological nitrogen fixation		
Natural Sciences	Molecular and Cellular Biology	Louis-Paul Dugal	Laval University	Metabolism of radioactive ascorbic acids in animals exposed to cold environments		
Natural Sciences	Molecular and Cellular Biology	Hans Gaffron	University of Chicago	Efficiency of the process of photosynthesis		
Natural Sciences	Molecular and Cellular Biology	Frank R. N. Gurd	Harvard Medical School	Apparent antagonism between actions of insulin and a certain lipoprotein fraction found in blood plasma		
Natural Sciences	Molecular and Cellular Biology	Donald James Hanahan				
Natural Sciences	Molecular and Cellular Biology	Teru Hayashi	Columbia University			
Natural Sciences	Molecular and Cellular Biology	Norman H. Horowitz	California Institute of Technology	Role of genes in the synthesis of enzymes		
Natural Sciences	Molecular and Cellular Biology	Bruce Connor Johnson	University of Illinois	Function of vitamin B12 and the mechanism of its action		
Natural Sciences	Molecular and Cellular Biology	Hardin Blair Jones	University of California			
Natural Sciences	Molecular and Cellular Biology	Max Kleiber	University of California, Davis			
Natural Sciences	Molecular and Cellular Biology	William N. Lipscomb	University of Minnesota	Valence theory with applications to electron deficient compounds	Also won in 1972	
Natural Sciences	Molecular and Cellular Biology	Arthur Hamilton Livermore	Reed College	Synthesis of glutathione by certain yeasts		
Natural Sciences	Molecular and Cellular Biology	Peter Reed Morrison	University of Wisconsin	Comparative physiology of certain Australian mammals		
Natural Sciences	Molecular and Cellular Biology	Arthur Leslie Neal	Cornell University	Biochemical relationships between plant pathogenic nematodes and their host plants		
Natural Sciences	Molecular and Cellular Biology	Hans Neurath				
Natural Sciences	Molecular and Cellular Biology	Man Chiang Niu	Stanford University	Problem of embryonic induction and organization	Also won in 1955	
Natural Sciences	Molecular and Cellular Biology	Esmond Emerson Snell	University of Texas	Chemical recactions in living cells	Also won in 1962 and 1970	
Natural Sciences	Molecular and Cellular Biology	Cornelis Bernardus van Niel	Stanford University	Formulation of hypotheses for the advancement of general biological thinking	Also won in 1944	
Natural Sciences	Molecular and Cellular Biology	John Lewis Wood	University of Tennessee Medical Units	Research at Harvard University and Massachusetts General Hospital		
Natural Sciences	Molecular and Cellular Biology	Gerard R. Wyatt	Dominion Laboratory of Insect Pathology	"Eskimo life along the Alaska-Canada boundary"		
Natural Sciences	Organismic Biology and Ecology	William J. Baerg				
Natural Sciences	Organismic Biology and Ecology	Arthur Grover Humes	Boston University	Copepoda concerned in the transmission of Dracunculiasis		
Natural Sciences	Organismic Biology and Ecology	Yoshio Kondo		Pacific island mollusca	Also won in 1953	
Natural Sciences	Organismic Biology and Ecology	Eugene Rabinowitch	University of Illinois	Photosynthesis and related processes		
Natural Sciences	Organismic Biology and Ecology	Edward Shearman Ross	California Academy of Sciences	Live insects in tropical environments		
Natural Sciences	Organismic Biology and Ecology	Arthur Henry Whiteley				
Natural Sciences	Physics	Herman Feshbach	Massachusetts Institute of Technology	Meson-nucleon interaction and of nucleon-nucleon forces		
Natural Sciences	Physics	Henry M. Foley				
Natural Sciences	Physics	William A. Fowler	California Institute of Technology	Nature of nuclear forces	Also won in 1961	
Natural Sciences	Physics	David H. Frisch	Massachusetts Institute of Technology	Research at the Niels Bohr Institute		
Natural Sciences	Physics	George Fred Koster	Massachusetts Institute of Technology	Electronic structure of diamond		
Natural Sciences	Physics	John Henry Manley	University of Washington			
Natural Sciences	Physics	Norman F. Ramsey Jr.	Harvard University	Development of new experimental and theoretical ideas in the field of physics		
Natural Sciences	Physics	Lewis Judson Stannard Jr.	University of Illinois	Patterns of evolution in the insect suborder Tubulifera		
Natural Sciences	Physics	John C. Wheatley	University of Illinois	Nuclear polarization in salts of the iron and rare earth group	Also won in 1980	
Natural Sciences	Physics	William M. Woodward				
Natural Sciences	Plant Science	Robert Wayne Allard	University of California, Los Angeles	Inheritance of metrical characters in wheat hybrids	Also won in 1960	
Natural Sciences	Plant Science	Grant Cottam	University of Wisconsin	Interrelations of plants and their environment		
Natural Sciences	Plant Science	Herbert Bashford Currier	University of California, Davis		Also won in 1961	
Natural Sciences	Plant Science	Ralph O. Erickson	University of Pennsylvania	Morphogenesis of the shoot apex, leaf, and stem in higher plants		
Natural Sciences	Plant Science	Roy N. Jervis		Social and economic effects of deforestation in Eastern Cuba		
Natural Sciences	Plant Science	George Hill Mathewson Lawrence	Cornell University	Cultivated ornamental flowering plants		
Natural Sciences	Plant Science	Jacob Levitt	University of Missouri			
Natural Sciences	Plant Science	Harlan Lewis	University of California, Los Angeles	Chromosal variants in certain wild plant species		
Natural Sciences	Plant Science	Marion Ownbey	Washington State College	Interrelationships of species		
Natural Sciences	Plant Science	Johannes Max Proskauer	University of California			
Natural Sciences	Plant Science	Edward Kemp Vaughan	Oregon State College	Viruses affecting certain bramble fruits		
Social Sciences	Anthropology and Cultural Studies	Richard Stockton MacNeish	National Museum of Canada	Development of aboriginal American culture		
Social Sciences	Anthropology and Cultural Studies	Hallam Leonard Movius Jr.	Harvard University	Origin and development of upper palaeolithic culture		
Social Sciences	Economics	Eveline Mabel Burns	New York School of Social Work			
Social Sciences	Economics	John P. Carter	University of California			
Social Sciences	Economics	Edgar Owen Edwards	Princeton University	Determinants of investment by the individual firm in a free enterprise economy		
Social Sciences	Economics	Walter Galenson	University of California			
Social Sciences	Economics	Alexander Gerschenkron	Harvard University	Certain phases of industrial development of Europe		
Social Sciences	Economics	Leo Grebler		Postwar urban rebuilding in Europe		
Social Sciences	Economics	Melvin Warren Reed	Stanford University	Economic status of the aged in the US and certain European countries		
Social Sciences	Economics	Lloyd George Reynolds	Yale University	Recent trends of wage rates in France, Sweden, Great Britain, and the US	Also won in 1966	
Social Sciences	Economics	George Joseph Stigler				
Social Sciences	Economics	Lorie Tarshis	Stanford University	Gross business saving and its relation to the national income		
Social Sciences	Economics	Friedrich August von Hayek	University of Chicago	Italy, Sicily, and Greece; the diary of John Stuart Mill; and the creative powers of free civilization		
Social Sciences	Law	Max Rheinstein	University of Chicago	Certain key problems of the law of conflict in laws		
Social Sciences	Political Science	Robert Kenneth Carr	Dartmouth College	Civil liberties in the US and Great Britain		
Social Sciences	Political Science	Karl Deutsch	Massachusetts Institute of Technology	Development of the idea of political community in Switzerland	Also won in 1971	
Social Sciences	Political Science	Leslie W. Dunbar	US Atomic Energy Commission			
Social Sciences	Political Science	Carl J. Friedrich	Harvard University	Conflict between the concept of civil liberties and the doctrine of "reason of state"	Also won in 1951	
Social Sciences	Political Science	Arthur Maass	Harvard University	Development of water rights and water law in Western US and certain European nations		
Social Sciences	Political Science	Bertus Harry Wabeke	US Department of State	History of Dutch propaganda in the US		
Social Sciences	Psychology	Clarence J. Pfaffenberger	Guide Dogs for the Blind and Galileo Adult School of San Francisco	Behavior of guide dogs	Also won in 1953	
Social Sciences	Sociology	Nathan Glazer			Also won in 1966	
Social Sciences	Sociology	Malcolm Jarvis Proudfoot	Northwestern University	Migration to the UK since 1939		
Social Sciences	Sociology	George Lee Simpson Jr.	University of North Carolina	Finishing Howard W. Odum's book Mid-Century South: The New Southern Regions of the United States		

== 1954 Latin American and Caribbean Fellows ==
Category	Field of Study	Fellow	Institutional association	Research topic	Notes	Ref
Creative Arts	Fiction	George Lamming		Writing		
Creative Arts	Fiction	René Marqués		Series: El cafe		
Creative Arts	Fine Arts	Rafael Tufiño	Graphic Arts Workshop			
Creative Arts	Music Composition	Juan A. Orrego-Salas			Also won in 1945	
Natural Sciences	Astronomy and Astrophysics	Víctor M. Blanco			Also won in 1948	
Natural Sciences	Chemistry	Manuel García Morín			Also won in 1955	
Natural Sciences	Earth Science	Félix González Bonorino			Also won in 1980	
Natural Sciences	Earth Science	Paulo Erichsen de Oliveira				
Natural Sciences	Medicine and Health	Silvio Díaz Escobar				
Natural Sciences	Medicine and Health	Lauro Sollero				
Natural Sciences	Molecular and Cellular Biology	Conrado Federico Asenjo			Also won in 1937 and 1938	
Natural Sciences	Molecular and Cellular Biology	Norberto José Palleroni			Also won in 1953 and 1955	
Natural Sciences	Molecular and Cellular Biology	Américo Pomales-Lebrón			Also won in 1963	
Natural Sciences	Neuroscience	Carlos Eyzaguirre			Also won in 1953	
Natural Sciences	Organismic Biology and Ecology	Renato L. Araujo				
Natural Sciences	Organismic Biology and Ecology	Jorge A. Crespo				
Natural Sciences	Organismic Biology and Ecology	Teodoro G. Megia				
Natural Sciences	Organismic Biology and Ecology	William H. Partridge				
Natural Sciences	Organismic Biology and Ecology	Pedro Wygodzinsky			Also won in 1959	
Natural Sciences	Plant Science	Gustavo Huertas González			Also won in 1955	
Natural Sciences	Plant Science	Mario Meneghini				
Natural Sciences	Plant Science	Gerardo Ocfemia				
Natural Sciences	Plant Science	Raulino Reitz			Also won in 1968	
Natural Sciences	Plant Science	Alfonso Trejos Willis			Also won in 1955	
Natural Sciences	Plant Science	Jorge Helios Morello Wyler			Also won in 1955 and 1958	
Social Sciences	Anthropology and Cultural Studies	Jean Caudmont				
Social Sciences	Anthropology and Cultural Studies	Alfredo Pacyaya				
Social Sciences	Anthropology and Cultural Studies	Lauro José Zavala				
Social Sciences	Sociology	Orlando Fals-Borda			Also won in 1953	

== See also ==
- Guggenheim Fellowship
- List of Guggenheim Fellowships awarded in 1953
- List of Guggenheim Fellowships awarded in 1955
