= Jane Costello =

Jane Costello may refer to:

- Jane Costello (writer), English journalist, newspaper editor and novelist
- Jane Costello (art historian), American art historian
