= Karl Loewenstein =

German lawyer and political scientist (1891–1973)

Karl Loewenstein (November 9, 1891 in Munich – July 10, 1973 in Heidelberg) was a German lawyer and political scientist, regarded as one of the prominent figures of constitutional law in the twentieth century.

His research and investigations into the typology of the different constitutions have had some impact on the Western constitutional thought. Loewenstein is credited with establishing the theoretical foundations of militant democracy to battle anti-democratic mass movements.

He worked as lecturer in his native city of Munich when Adolf Hitler's Nazi Party took power in 1933. Loewenstein went to the United States, becoming chair of political science at Amherst College and published extensively. He received American citizenship and after World War II worked for the Allied Military Government of Occupied Territories (AMG) in West Germany.

== Life and career ==
Karl Loewenstein was born in 1891 into a Jewish family that had assimilated in Munich's German-Jewish bourgeoisie. The young Loewenstein studied at the Ludwig-Maximilians-Universität München, Heidelberg University, the University of Paris, and the Friedrich Wilhelm University of Berlin. He settled in Munich and in 1918 was called to the bar in Bavaria. Loewenstein received his doctorate in law from the Ludwig-Maximilians-Universität München in 1919. In the 1920s, Loewenstein continued his studies and built up a law practice in international commercial law. In 1931 Loewenstein completed his postgraduate studied on comparative government and began working as a part-time lecturer in law at the Ludwig-Maximilians-Universität München.

=== Exile in the United States ===
After the Nazi Party seized power in 1933 Loewenstein immigrated to the United States and worked for two years at Yale University as a lecturer in politics. In 1936 Loewenstein became chair of political science and jurisprudence at Amherst College. Soon after, the work-obsessed Loewenstein received American citizenship, was called to the bar in Massachusetts and began publishing extensively on European and South American fascist movements. Loewenstein remained emotionally connected to his German homeland and the Nazi rise to power filled him with great sorrow. He published an academic review of how the Nazis parasitized the German Civil Code in the three years since taking power, explaining bitterly that "National Socialism is anti-liberal and anti-individualistic, by implication it is irrational, mystical, and romantic; by its result it is totalitarian to the point of religious obsession."

In 1937 Loewenstein published two articles in The American Political Science Review which analyzed the failure of the Weimar Republic and the collapse of democracies on the European continent after World War I. Loewenstein argued that the failed European democracies lacked effective instruments to defend against modern anti-democratic movements. Loewenstein coined the term militant democracy (streitbare Demokratie) when he described a battle-ready democracy that was equipped with robust constitutional mechanisms to withstand an autocrat who by popular vote acquired office within a democratic institution. Loewenstein summarized his academic analysis of Fascist power grabs on the European continent in the 1930s and concluded that the enemies of democracy would exploit the freedoms guaranteed in a democracy to disable the democratic order from within while at the same time insisting on their own individual rights guaranteed by the rule of law. Therefore, Loewenstein reasoned that a self-preserving democratic state should be prepared to use emergency powers and temporarily suspend a fundamental human right, if the institutional rule of law is obstructed or sabotaged. Loewenstein maintained that fascism had no intellectual kernel and instead relied on "emotionalism" that cannot be battled by normal democratic means. He contended that "fire should be fought with fire" and that in the face of adversity, a more "disciplined" democracy was needed.

In 1939 the John Simon Guggenheim Memorial Foundation awarded Loewenstein a fellowship and he was able to travel to Latin America for research. In the wake of the 1941 Atlantic Charter, which set out American and British goals for the world after the end of World War II, the American Law Institute (ALI) invited Loewenstein and Ernst Rabel to join a committee of international experts as representatives of pre-Nazi German legal culture. The committee issued advice for the drafting of a Statement of Essential Human Rights. Loewenstein argued that human rights can only be realized in a democracy and formulated a right to participation in government which was adopted as Article 16 of the ALI draft: "[e]very one has the right to take part in the government of his state", which corresponded to a duty of the state "to conform to the will of the people as manifested by democratic elections". Between 1942 and 1944 Loewenstein worked for the US Justice Department. In 1943 and 1944 Loewenstein also completed work for the Foreign Economic Administration (FEA).

=== Denazification ===
When World War II ended in 1945 Loewenstein jumped at the opportunity to work as a consultant for the Allied Military Government of Occupied Territories (AMG). Loewenstein arrived in occupied Berlin in July 1945 and alongside twenty other lawyers worked for the Legal Division, a US military organ tasked with reforming Germany's legal structure. The prominent German jurist Carl Schmitt was immediately targeted by the AMG because the American military governor of occupied Germany Lucius D. Clay ordered that the intellectual masterminds of Nazi Germany should also be bought before the Nuremberg Tribunal. Loewenstein was tasked with investigating Schmitt and had him arrested without charges in September 1945. Loewenstein impounded Schmitt's book collection for the use by the AMG. In November Loewenstein completed the arrest report which attested Schmitt a substantial influence in Nazi Germany and a worldwide reputation as chief ideologist for totalitarian and fascist movements with particular influence in France, Spain, and Latin America. An investigating committee cleared Schmitt and he was released in October 1946, only to be summoned to the Nuremberg trials by Ossip K. Flechtheim. When interrogated by Robert Kempner before being released again, Schmitt replied, "There is nothing being brought against me other than what I have written".

Loewenstein traveled Allied-occupied Germany for 15 months and helped to identify judges, lawyers and law professors that should be banned from contributing to Germany's jurisprudence. As one of only three German lawyers working for the Legal Division, Loewenstein acted as intelligence officer and conducted interviews with members of the German legal profession. Loewenstein was called the "pope of denazification" by his colleagues for his efforts to reform the German Bar Association. Loewenstein succeeded in making the German Bar independent of political oversight.

=== Munich University professorship ===
In 1946 Loewenstein refused the offer of a professorship in legal history at Erlangen University. Instead Loewenstein between 1949 and 1952 campaigned for the established of a political science faculty in Germany. Starting in 1949 Loewenstein held several lectures on the nature of political science. Loewenstein was joined by the exiles Franz Neumann, Ferdinand Hermens and Alexander Rüstow in the attempt to establish political science an independent faculty that developed methodologies of research with autonomy from university subjects such as philosophy, history and jurisprudence. Loewenstein regarded the US political science faculty as the benchmark for academic discipline and lamented that the German academic tradition suffered because it regarded political power as a Gothic force with the demonic characteristics of love and faith. Loewenstein, himself professor of political science in the US, forcefully dissented. "Politics is nothing else but the struggle for power". He regarded political science as autonomous university subject because "more and more, power is being considered the dynamic infrastructure of sociopolitical institutions".

Political science was established as separate university subject in West Germany and 16 exiles were appointed as full-time political science professors during the 1950s and 1960s. Ernst Fraenkel, Ossip K. Flechtheim, and Richard Löwenthal received professorships in the social democratic West Berlin. While the universities in the liberal-conservative mainland West Germany awarded professorships to Arnold Bergstraesser, Heinrich Brüning, Ferdinand A. Hermens, Fritz Morstein Marx, and Eric Voegelin. Loewenstein pursued his own academic ambition and after political maneuvering he was appointed professor of political science at the Ludwig-Maximilians-Universität München. The university's faculty of law, whose members were predominantly former Nazis, considered Loewenstein's appointment particularly controversial. When the Nazi Party seized power in 1933 Loewenstein had worked as a law lecturer at the Ludwig-Maximilians-Universität München. He felt compelled to go into exile when his university office was stormed by Nazis. Loewenstein was 65 years old when he was appointed and was formally put on leave from teaching at the Ludwig-Maximilians-Universität München, so he could continue to retain his primary residence and professorship in the US.

=== Constitutional theory ===
In 1957 Loewenstein published his book on Political Power and the Governmental Process (retitled Verfassungslehre in a later translation into German), which was reprinted several times. Loewenstein categorized constitutions according to their impact on the rule of law. He distinguished between three types of constitutions. A normative constitution is fully effective, the political system is compliant with the provisions of the constitution and politicians are bound by law. A nominal constitution is not fully effective as practical implementation of constitutional provisions is hindered by political and economic power structures or because laws are generally not faithfully applied. Loewenstein categorized constitutions that reflect a political vision but had no impact on the rule of law as semantic. He maintained that countries in the Western bloc typically had normative constitutions. He theorized that states with colonial or feudal social structure are most likely to have a nominal constitution. He wrote a book on Max Weber's political ideas and examined their relevance to the then-present of 1966.

== Works ==
- Minderheitsregierung in Großbritannien. Verfassungsrechtliche Untersuchungen zur neuesten Entwicklung des britischen Parlamentarismus. Munich: Schweitzer, 1925, first in: Annalen des deutschen Reiches 56/58 (1923/1925).
- Erscheinungsformen der Verfassungsänderung. Verfassungsrechtsdogmatische Untersuchungen zu Artikel 76 der Reichsverfassung, Tübingen 1931.
- Hitler's Germany: The Nazi Background to War New York, MacMillan, 1939.
- Political reconstruction, New York : The Macmillan company, 1946.
- Political power and the governmental process. Chicago, The University of Chicago Press, 1957.
- Verfassungsrecht und Verfassungspraxis der Vereinigten Staaten Berlin, Springer, 1959.
- Staatsrecht und Staatspraxis Großbritanniens Berlin, Springer-Verlag, 1967, 2 Vols.
- Kooptation und Zuwahl. Über die autonome Bildung privilegierter Gruppen. Alfred Metzner Verlag, Frankfurt am Main 1973, ISBN 3-7875-5230-8.
- The Governance of ROME. The Hague: Springer. 2013 [1973]. ISBN 978-94-015-0378-5.
- Des Lebens Überfluß. Erinnerungen eines ausgewanderten Juristen. Herausgegeben von Oliver Lepsius, Robert Chr. van Ooyen und Frank Schale, Mohr Siebeck, Tübingen 2023, ISBN 978-3-16-162509-1.
- Apologie des liberalen Staatsdenkens. Herausgegeben von Michael Kubitscheck, Klostermann Verlag, Frankfurt am Main 2024, ISBN 978-3-465-04655-4.

== Festschrift ==
- Festschrift für Karl Loewenstein : aus Anlass seines achtzigsten Geburtstages / Herausgegeben von Henry Steele Commager [et al.]. Tübingen : Mohr, 1971.

== See also ==
- Constitutional law
