= John Derek Smith =

British molecular biologist (1924–2003)

John Derek Smith FRS (Born 8 December 1924 Southampton, England - died 22 November 2003 in Cambridge) was a British molecular biologist who participated in many of the major discoveries at the Laboratory of Molecular Biology (LMB) in Cambridge.

== Career ==
- Scientific staff, Agricultural Research Council Virus Research Unit, Cambridge 1945-59;
- Research Fellow, Clare College, Cambridge 1949-52;
- Rockefeller Foundation Fellow, University of California, Berkeley 1955-57;
- Senior Research Fellow, California Institute of Technology 1959-62,
- Member of Scientific Staff, LMB, Cambridge 1962-88

- Sherman Fairchild Scholar 1974-75;
- Head, Subdivision of Biochemistry, Cell Biology Division 1976-88
- FRS 1976;

He was one of the very few scientists who understood the importance of nucleic acids before 1953. According to Nobel Laureate Sidney Altman

"John Smith was a venerable nucleic acids biochemist. He had worked on the nucleic acids of viruses long before coming to the MRC-LMB and was an expert on identification and characterization of nucleotides, much of it done on unlabeled material, detected by observing chromatographs under UV light. He was a quiet person but very lively in conversations about science."

His doctoral students include Gerard R. Wyatt.

== Personal life ==
In 1955 he married Ruth Aney (marriage dissolved 1968). He had a long term relationship with Rosemary Myers, an artist, which continued until his death.
