= Max Rheinstein =

German-American lawyer

- Born: July 5, 1899; Bad Kreuznach, Germany
- Died: July 9, 1977 (aged 78); Bad Gastein, Austria
- Education: Ludwig-Maximilians-Universität München, Kaiser Wilhelm Institute for Foreign and International Private Law
- Occupations: jurist and political scientist
- Employer: University of Chicago Law School
- Known for: participated in the overthrow of the Bavarian Soviet Republic
- Parents: Ferdinand Rheinstein (father); Rosalie Bernheim (mother)
- Awards: Ordre des Palmes académiques, Great Cross of Merit of the Federal Republic of Germany, Guggenheim Fellowship in 1954

Max Rheinstein (July 5, 1899 − July 9, 1977) was a German-born American jurist and political scientist. He was for many years a professor at the University of Chicago Law School.

== Biography ==
Max Rheinstein was born on July 5, 1899, in Bad Kreuznach, the only son of wine merchant Ferdinand Rheinstein (1842-1904) and Rosalie Bernheim (1858-1928). He fought in the German Army in World War I, and subsequently studied law at the Ludwig-Maximilians-Universität München. In the spring of 1919, Rheinstein participated in the overthrow of the Bavarian Soviet Republic. Becoming an assistant of Ernst Rabel, Rheinstein received his doctorate in law in 1924. He subsequently followed Rabel to Berlin as a research lecturer at the Kaiser Wilhelm Institute for Foreign and International Private Law, where he supervised the institute library. He joined the Social Democratic Party of Germany (SPD) in 1928.

Unlike other SPD-members and Jews, Rheinstein was not dismissed from his position after the Nazi seizure of power, due to the fact that he had fought the Bavarian Soviet Republic in 1919. In February 1933, he received a scholarship from the Rockefeller Foundation, and immigrated to the United States, where he began working at Columbia Law School. In 1936, he was appointed Max Pam Professor of American and Foreign Law and Professor of Political Science at the University of Chicago Law School, a position he held until his retirement in 1968. Rheinstein became an American citizen in 1940. After World War II, Rheinstein returned to Germany, where he was a member of the Legal Division of the Office of Military Government and served in a division of the Allied Control Council in Berlin.

In 1953, Rheinstein was awarded the Ordre des Palmes académiques and the Great Cross of Merit of the Federal Republic of Germany. He was awarded a Guggenheim Fellowship in 1954. Until 1968 he was a member of the American Academy of Arts and Sciences.

Rheinstein moved to Palo Alto, California in 1976 for health reasons. He died in Bad Gastein, Austria on July 9, 1977.

== Selected publications ==
- Rheinstein, Max, ed. (1966). Max Weber on Law in Economy and Society. Translated by Shils, Edward; Rheinstein, Max. Cambridge, MA: Harvard University Press – via Internet Archive.
- Marriage Stability, Divorce and the Law. Chicago and London: The University of Chicago Press. 1972 – via Internet Archive.
