= Henry G. Booker =

Henry George Booker
- Born: December 14, 1910; Essex, England
- Died: November 1, 1988 (aged 77); La Jolla, California, U.S.
- Education: Cambridge University
- Occupations: Physicist; Engineer
- Known for: worldwide authority on radio wave propagation
- Scientific career
- Fields: engineering, radiophysics
- Workplaces: Cambridge University; Cornell University; University of California, San Diego
- Doctoral advisor: J. A. Ratcliffe
- Doctoral students: William E. Gordon

Henry George Booker (December 14, 1910 – November 1, 1988) was an Anglo-American physicist and electrical engineer.

Booker was a member of the National Academy of Sciences. He was head of panel on stratospheric pollution. He was a head of the Maths Group at Worth focused on radio propagation. He was director of the Cornell University’s school of electrical engineering, and the founder of department of electrical engineering and computer science at University of California, San Diego. The New York Times called Booker "worldwide authority on radio wave propagation", as well as "one of the world's foremost authorities on the propagation of electric waves"

== Career and life ==
Henry George Booker was born in 1910 in Barking, then in Essex but now in London, England. He went to Palmer's School in Grays, Essex and graduated from Cambridge University with a B.A. degree in applied and pure maths in 1933. He received Ph.D. from Cambridge in 1936 in ionospheric physics. Booker researched radio wave propagation as a Fellow of Christ's College, and continued this research as a visiting scientist at the Carnegie Institution's Department of Terrestrial Magnetism.

During World War II, Booker headed theoretical research at the Telecommunications Research Establishment in England. He conducted further research into radio wave propagation for the Royal Air Force, which led to significant developments in the understanding of antennas. After the war, Booker returned to Christ's College to teach until 1948. Post-1948, Booker taught exclusively in the United States. He received U.S. citizenship in 1952.

In 1965, Booker moved from Cornell to the University of California, San Diego, where he became the first chair of the department of applied electrophysics, later to become the department of electrical and computer engineering. He remained at UC, San Diego as emeritus professor until the day of his death.

He died of complications from a brain tumor in La Jolla, California, on November 1, 1988.

== Awards and Distinctions ==
- 1934 Allen Scholarship, Cambridge University
- 1935 Smith's Prize, Cambridge University
- 1947 Duddell Premium, Institution of Electrical Engineers
- 1948 Kelvin Premium, Institution of Electrical Engineers
- 1953 Fellow of the Institute of Electrical and Electronics Engineers
- 1954 Guggenheim Fellowship
- 1960 Member of the National Academy of Sciences in 1960
- 1970 50th Anniversary Medal, American Meteorological Society
- 1981 Honorary professor, Wuhan University, Hubei, China
- 1984 Centennial Medal, Institute of Electrical and Electronics Engineers
