= Max Kleiber =

Swiss biologist (1893–1976)

Max Kleiber (4 January 1893–5 January 1976) was a Swiss agricultural biologist, born and educated in Zürich, Switzerland.

Kleiber graduated from the Swiss Federal Institute of Technology as an Agricultural Chemist in 1920, earned the ScD degree in 1924, and became a Privatdozent after publishing his thesis, The Energy Concept in the Science of Nutrition.

Kleiber joined the Animal Husbandry Department of the University of California, Davis (UC Davis) in 1929 to construct respiration chambers and conduct research on energy metabolism in animals. Among his many important achievements, two are especially noteworthy. In 1932, he came to the conclusion that the ¾ power of body weight was the most reliable basis for predicting the basal metabolic rate (BMR) of animals and for comparing nutrient requirements among animals of different sizes. He also provided the basis for the conclusion that total efficiency of energy utilization is independent of body size. These concepts and several others fundamental for understanding energy metabolism are discussed in Kleiber's book, The Fire of Life, published in 1961 and subsequently translated into German, Polish, Spanish, and Japanese.

He is credited with the description of the ratio of metabolism to body mass, which became Kleiber's law. Kleiber's law is the observation that, for the vast majority of animals, an animal's metabolic rate scales to the 3/4 power of the animal's mass. More recently, Kleiber's law has also been shown to apply in plants, suggesting that Kleiber's observation is much more general.

== Books ==
- 1961: The Fire of Life: An Introduction to Animal Energetics

== Awards ==
- 1954 Guggenheim Fellowship for Natural Sciences (US & Canada), in Molecular and Cellular Biology
