= Ann Perkins (historian) =

American archaeologist and art historian (1915-2006)

- Born: April 18, 1915; Chicago, Illinois, U.S.
- Died: May 7, 2006 (aged 91); Urbana, Illinois, U.S.
- Occupations: Archaeologist; art historian
- Awards: Guggenheim Fellowship (1954)

Academic background
- Education: University of Chicago
- Thesis: The Comparative Stratigraphy of Prehistoric Mesopotamia (1940)
- Doctoral advisor: Henri Frankfort

Academic work
- Discipline: Archaeology; art history
- Sub-discipline: Near Eastern archaeology; classical era art
- Institutions: University of Chicago; Yale University; University of Illinois Urbana-Champaign

Ann Louise Perkins (April 18, 1915 – May 7, 2006) was an American archaeologist and art historian. She began her career as a graduate and research assistant at the University of Chicago's Oriental Institute, then taught at Yale University and became a full professor at the University of Illinois Urbana-Champaign. After publishing her 1949 book The Comparative Archeology of Early Mesopotamia, she switched from Near Eastern archaeology to classical era art after working with the excavations of the ancient city of Dura-Europos, and then published the 1973 book The Art of Dura-Europos.

== Biography ==
=== Early life and education career ===
Perkins was born on April 18, 1915, in Chicago; her parents were Grace and Joseph Atwood Perkins. After attending Morton High School in Morton, Illinois, she studied at the University of Chicago, where she got her BA in 1935 and MA in 1936, before getting a PhD in Near Eastern archaeology at the Oriental Institute in 1940. Her doctoral dissertation The Comparative Stratigraphy of Prehistoric Mesopotamia was supervised by Henri Frankfort.

After working at the Oriental Institute as a research assistant since 1942, Perkins moved to the Yale University Department of Classics to become a research associate there in 1949. Although she could not work as an undergraduate teacher at Yale as a woman, she often taught Yale graduate students as an associate professor and also worked as a visiting professor at other universities. In 1965, she moved to the University of Illinois Urbana-Champaign to become a full professor. In 1978, she retired from UI and became a professor emeritus. She worked at UI's Center for Advanced Study during her last years at the university.

=== Academic career ===
In 1949, Perkins published her book The Comparative Archeology of Early Mesopotamia. In 1954, she was awarded a Guggenheim Fellowship to study Mesopotamian archaeology. She was a 1959/1960 United States Department of State specialist for one of their Middle East tours of duty.

Although originally interested in Near Eastern archaeology, Perkins's experience with the excavations of the ancient city of Dura-Europos, including her work on a preliminary report, the organization of remains and files, and her role as an executive editor for Yale's publications in the field, piqued her academic interest in classical era art. She became interested in Mediterranean art, particularly Eastern Roman art from the Hellenistic and Roman eras. In 1973, she published The Art of Dura-Europos.

Perkins wrote the American Journal of Archaeology's "Archaeological Bibliography" and Near East "Archaeological News" articles and, from 1957 to 1977, was an advisory board member for the journal. She also contributed to the Encyclopedia Americana, the Encyclopædia Britannica, and the Interpreter's Bible series.

=== Personal life and death ===
In addition to academia, Perkins was also interested in music; she was a violinist and choral singer in high school, before being a choral and madrigal singer while working at Yale.

Perkins lived in Champaign, Illinois. She died on May 7, 2006, in Urbana, Illinois, aged 91.

== Bibliography ==
- The Comparative Archeology of Early Mesopotamia (1949)
- The Art of Dura-Europos (1973)
