= Oscar Koch =

United States Army general

Oscar W. Koch
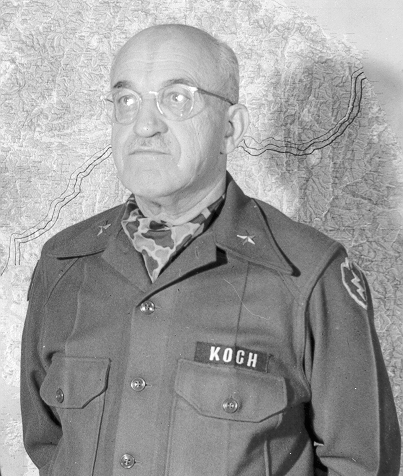
- Koch as assistant division commander of the 25th Infantry Division in 1954
- Born: January 10, 1897; Milwaukee, Wisconsin, US
- Died: May 16, 1970 (aged 73); Marion, Illinois, US
- Burial place: Arlington National Cemetery
- Spouse: Nannie Caldwell (m. 1924-1970, his death)
- Military career
- Allegiance: United States of America
- Branch: United States Army
- Service years: 1915–1954
- Rank: Brigadier General
- Unit: U. S. Army Cavalry Branch
- Commands: Troop A, 105th Cavalry Regiment; Troop A, 8th Cavalry Regiment; Ground Forces Intelligence School; 25th Infantry Division
- Conflicts: Pancho Villa Expedition; World War I World War II; Korean War
- Awards: Distinguished Service Medal; Legion of Merit (2); Bronze Star Medal (2)

Oscar W. Koch (January 10, 1897 – May 16, 1970) was a brigadier general in the United States Army. He was most notable for his service as Third Army's Intelligence officer (G-2) under General George S. Patton in World War II.

A native of Milwaukee, Wisconsin, Koch was raised and educated in Milwaukee and joined the Wisconsin National Guard as a private in 1915. He served in the Pancho Villa Expedition in 1916, and rose through the ranks to become corporal, sergeant, and regimental sergeant major. When his unit was federalized for World War I as part of the 32nd Division, Koch served in France and received his commission as a second lieutenant of Field Artillery. He then served as an instructor at the Army's wartime artillery school in Saumur.

After the war, Koch returned to Milwaukee, where he was one of the re-organizers of his old Wisconsin National Guard unit, which he commanded as a captain. He obtained a Regular Army commission as a second lieutenant of Cavalry in 1920, was quickly promoted to first lieutenant, and was appointed to command a troop of the 8th Cavalry Regiment. Koch slowly advanced through the ranks in the 1920s and 1930s, and developed a positive reputation as an instructor and academic, primarily as a member of the faculty at the Army's Cavalry School at Fort Riley, Kansas.

During World War II, Koch joined the staff of George S. Patton's 2nd Armored Division as Intelligence officer (G-2). Koch served under Patton in North Africa and Europe as Patton successively commanded I Armored Corps, II Corps, Seventh Army, and Third Army. During the war, Koch developed procedures and policies for gathering and analyzing intelligence and providing recommendations to commanders, many of which continued to be used after the war.

Following the war, Koch served as deputy commandant and commandant of the Army's first Intelligence school, and as director of intelligence for the Allied occupation of Austria. He was promoted to brigadier general in 1954, and served in the Korean War as assistant division commander and acting commander of the 25th Infantry Division. He retired in September 1954. After retiring, Koch resided in his wife's hometown of Carbondale, Illinois, where he was active in several civic and fraternal organizations. He also authored a brief memoir of his World War II service, which continues to be used as a guide for Military Intelligence professionals. Koch died in Marion, Illinois and was buried at Arlington National Cemetery.

== Early life ==
Oscar Koch was born in Milwaukee, Wisconsin on January 10, 1897, a son of Oscar Koch Jr. and Emma (Zimmerman) Koch. He attended the public schools of Milwaukee and graduated from North Division High School. In high school, Koch played center on the football team and was named to the 1913 all-city team.

== Start of career ==
Koch began his military career in 1915 with Troop A, 1st Wisconsin Cavalry Regiment. In 1916, the regiment was federalized during the Pancho Villa Expedition, and Koch served on the Mexico–United States border. Enlisting as a private, Koch advanced to corporal and sergeant, and was appointed regimental sergeant major in 1917.

== World War I ==
During World War I, Koch's unit was activated as part of the 32nd Division. Koch was born Oscar Koch III, and his parents did not give him a middle name. Because the Army habitually asked for a middle initial when Koch completed forms and signed documents, he chose "W" at random and said his middle name was William. Afterwards he was known as Oscar W. Koch or O. W. Koch.

During the division's organization and training at Camp MacArthur, Texas, Koch played on its football team. While in France, he served with the 32nd Division's 2nd Battalion, 120th Field Artillery Regiment. In April 1918, he received his commission as a second lieutenant of Field Artillery. He was then assigned as an instructor at the U.S. Army artillery school established in Saumur.

== Continued career ==
After the war, Koch returned to Milwaukee. One of the organizers of the reconstituted National Guard's Troop A, 105th Cavalry Regiment, Koch was appointed to command the troop as a captain. In 1920, Koch was commissioned in the regular army as a first lieutenant of Cavalry, and was appointed to command Troop A, 8th Cavalry Regiment. He was a 1922 graduate of the Army's basic course for Cavalry officers, after which he was assigned to the 14th Cavalry Regiment at Fort Des Moines, Iowa. He completed the course for Signal Corps officers in 1925. After graduation, he was again assigned to the 8th Cavalry Regiment at Fort Bliss, Texas.

In 1928, Koch was assigned as Signal Corps instructor for the Kansas National Guard and posted to Kansas City. In 1931, Koch was named the Signal Corps instructor for the South Dakota National Guard and assigned to Watertown. In 1932 he was assigned to Saint Paul, Minnesota as Signal instructor for the Minnesota National Guard. In February 1932, he was again promoted to captain.

Koch graduated from Fort Riley's advanced course for Cavalry officers in 1933 and remained at the school as an instructor. While on the faculty, Koch was selected by the Army to attend courses in pedagogy at the University of Michigan. During his coursework, Koch completed a study on the history of military historical research. His work was reviewed by a doctoral committee and accepted as a dissertation, but Koch did not receive academic credit because he was auditing courses, not attending as part of a degree program. The Army published Koch's study, as it did a later Koch work on educational psychology, which became required reading at the United States Military Academy. Fluent in German, while at the Cavalry school, Koch translated several German military works into English, enabling the U.S. Army to study and make use of them.

== World War II ==
In 1940, George S. Patton was selected to command the 2nd Armored Division; having known Koch since being assigned as the Cavalry School's director of instruction in 1937, Patton asked Koch to join his staff. Koch agreed, and served as his Intelligence officer (G-2). In 1941, Koch graduated from the United States Army Command and General Staff College. When Patton assumed command of I Armored Corps, Koch again served as his G-2.

During the North African campaign, Koch served as chief of staff for one of Patton's subordinate task forces, Blackstone, which was commanded by Ernest N. Harmon. Subsequently, Koch served as Patton's G-2 as Patton commanded II Corps in North Africa, Seventh Army during the Allied invasion of Sicily, and Third Army during combat in France following the Normandy landing.

In December 1944, Koch warned Patton that intelligence indicators pointed to an imminent large-scale German offensive against First Army in the Ardennes, to Third Army's north. Though G-2s at other commands believed Germany incapable of a large scale offensive, Patton heeded Koch's warning and incorporated emergency measures for aiding First Army into his subsequent plans. As a result, when Germany launched the offensive that became known as the Battle of the Bulge, Third Army was prepared to reorient from attacking on a west to east axis to advance north towards First Army and immediately enter combat. Third Army's effort helped end the German offensive and left the Allies prepared to enter Germany in the spring of 1945.

== Post-World War II ==
Koch remained in Germany after the end of the war. In 1946, he was appointed deputy commandant of the Army's new Ground Forces Intelligence School at Fort Riley, Kansas. In 1947, he was named commandant. He completed his military education with graduation from the National War College. Koch next served as director of intelligence for Geoffrey Keyes during Keyes' appointment as Allied High Commissioner in Austria. During this posting, Koch took part in transferring responsibility for intelligence gathering in Austria from the Army to the Central Intelligence Agency. Koch next served as deputy director of Training (Special) at the CIA, responsible for training of covert Agency personnel. He held this position until February 1952 and was succeeded by Rolfe W. Kingsely.

Koch was promoted to brigadier general in January, 1954 and was assigned as assistant division commander of the 25th Infantry Division during its Korean War service. After briefly acting as division commander in May 1954, in June he was assigned to the Career Management Division in the Office of the U.S. Army Adjutant General. Koch retired from military service in September, 1954. After leaving the military, Koch was given cover employment with the United States Department of State. In fact, he worked for the Central Intelligence Agency, though in what capacity he worked during this tenure with the CIA is unknown because Koch did not discuss it with friends, relatives, or his biographer.

== Retirement and death ==
In retirement, Koch settled in Carbondale, Illinois, his wife's hometown. He became a noted civic activist, including serving on the board of directors of Carbondale's Rotary Club and the Carbondale YMCA board of managers. He also served on the city government's Citizens Advisory Council and was a trustee of Carbondale's First Christian Church, an affiliate of the Disciples of Christ. In addition, he was active in several Masonic organizations, the Elks, and the Jackson County Historical Society. Koch also led unsuccessful efforts to have Carbondale's Woodlawn Cemetery declared a national shrine to commemorate John A. Logan's work to create a national Memorial Day holiday, which began in Carbondale in 1866.

In his later years, Koch was treated for cancer. He died at the Veterans Administration hospital in Marion, Illinois on May 16, 1970. Koch was buried at Arlington National Cemetery.

== Family ==
In August 1924, Koch married Nannie Caldwell (1898–1995), whom he met while he was participating in a horse show at the Iowa State Fair. They remained married until his death, and had no children.

== Legacy ==
Koch was inducted into the Military Intelligence Hall of Fame in 1993. In addition, in 1993 the United States Army Intelligence Center named one of its buildings Koch Barracks.

Koch received a 1954 Guggenheim Fellowship, which he intended to use to author a work on the conduct of military intelligence activities. Shortly before his death, he completed the book, which he coauthored with Robert G. Hays, G2: Intelligence for Patton. Hays reissued this work in 1999, and it remains an important "how to" text for military intelligence professionals. In 2013, Hays published a second work about his friendship with Koch, Patton's Oracle: Gen. Oscar Koch, As I Knew Him.

== Promotions ==
Insignia	Rank	Component	Date
	Second lieutenant	National Army	January 10, 1918
	Captain	National Guard	December 4, 1919
	Second lieutenant	Regular Army	July 1, 1920
	First lieutenant	National Army	July 1, 1920
	Captain	Regular Army	February 1, 1932
	Major	Regular Army	August 15, 1939
	Lieutenant colonel	Army of the United States	April 25, 1941
	Lieutenant colonel	Regular Army	December 18, 1941
	Colonel	Army of the United States	January 7, 1943
	Brigadier general	Army of the United States	January 22, 1954

== Medals and decorations ==
Koch's awards and decorations included:

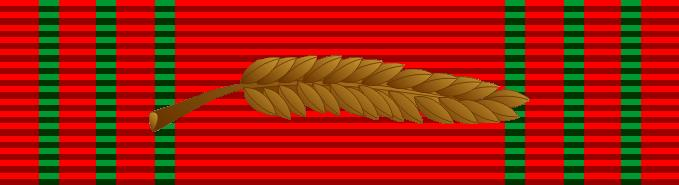
Army Distinguished Service Medal
Legion of Merit with one Oak Leaf Cluster
Bronze Star Medal with one Oak Leaf Cluster
Mexican Border Service Medal
World War I Victory Medal
American Defense Service Medal
American Campaign Medal
European-African-Middle Eastern Campaign Medal with Arrowhead device and silver and 3 bronze service stars
World War II Victory Medal
Army of Occupation Medal
National Defense Service Medal
Korean Service Medal
Legion of Honour, Chevalier (France)
French Croix de Guerre 1939–1945 with Palm
Belgian Croix de guerre 1940-1945 with Palm
Order of the Oak Crown, Officer (Luxembourg)
Order of Leopold (Belgium)
Order of the Patriotic War Second Class (Union of Soviet Socialist Republics)
United Nations Korea Medal

== Photos ==
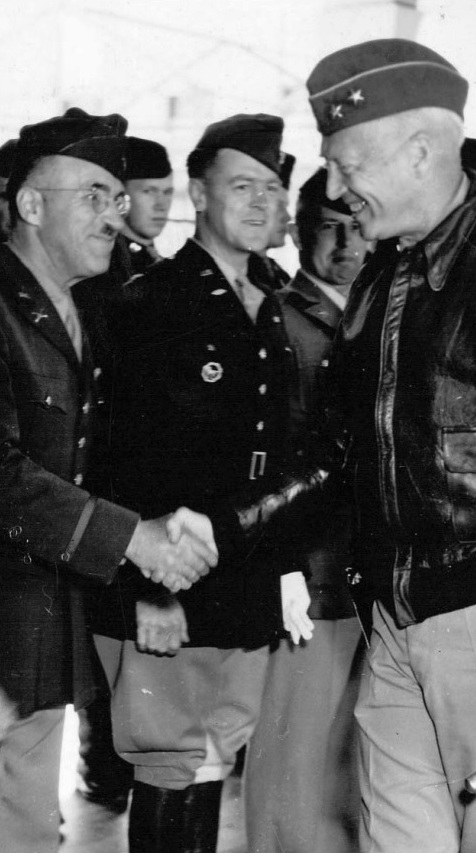
Oscar W. Koch receives congratulations from I Armored Corps commander George Patton in May 1942.

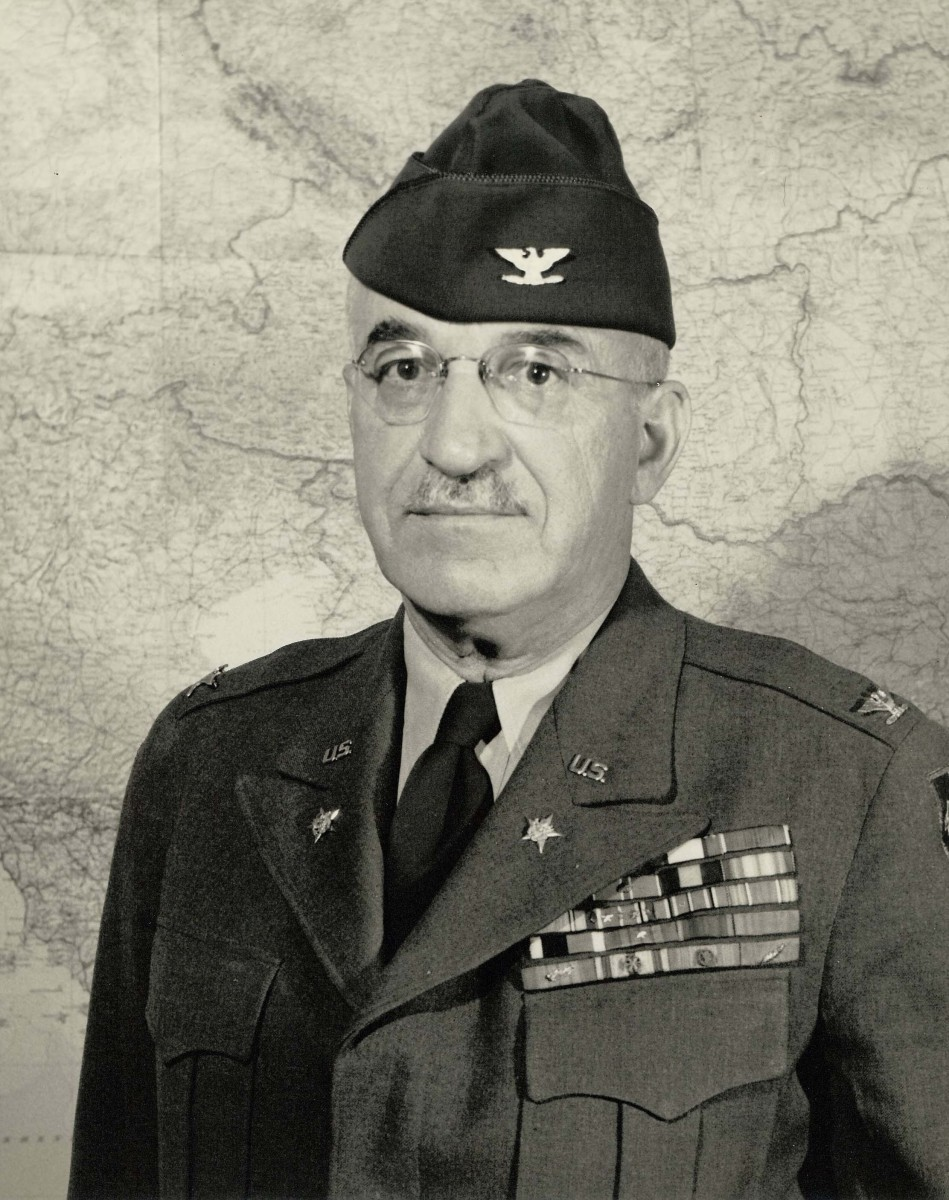
Oscar W. Koch as Intelligence officer (G2) on staff of Third US Army. Circa 1944.

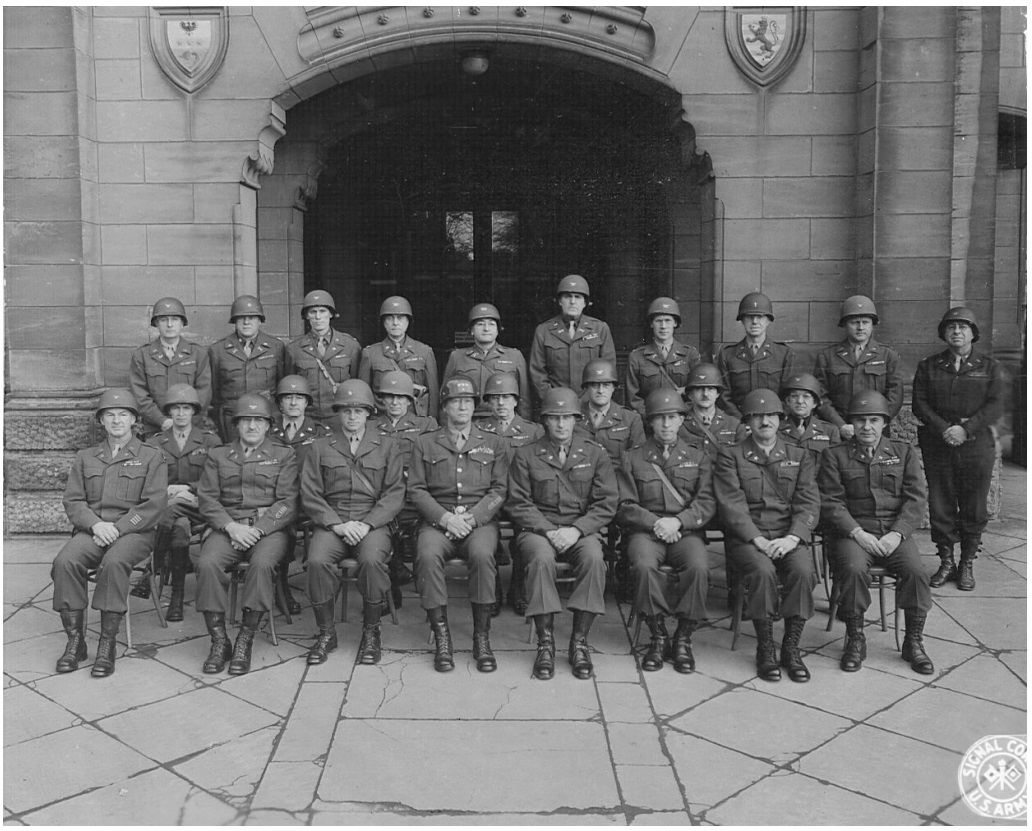
GEN George Patton and Third US Army staff. Oscar Koch front row, second from left. Circa May 1945.

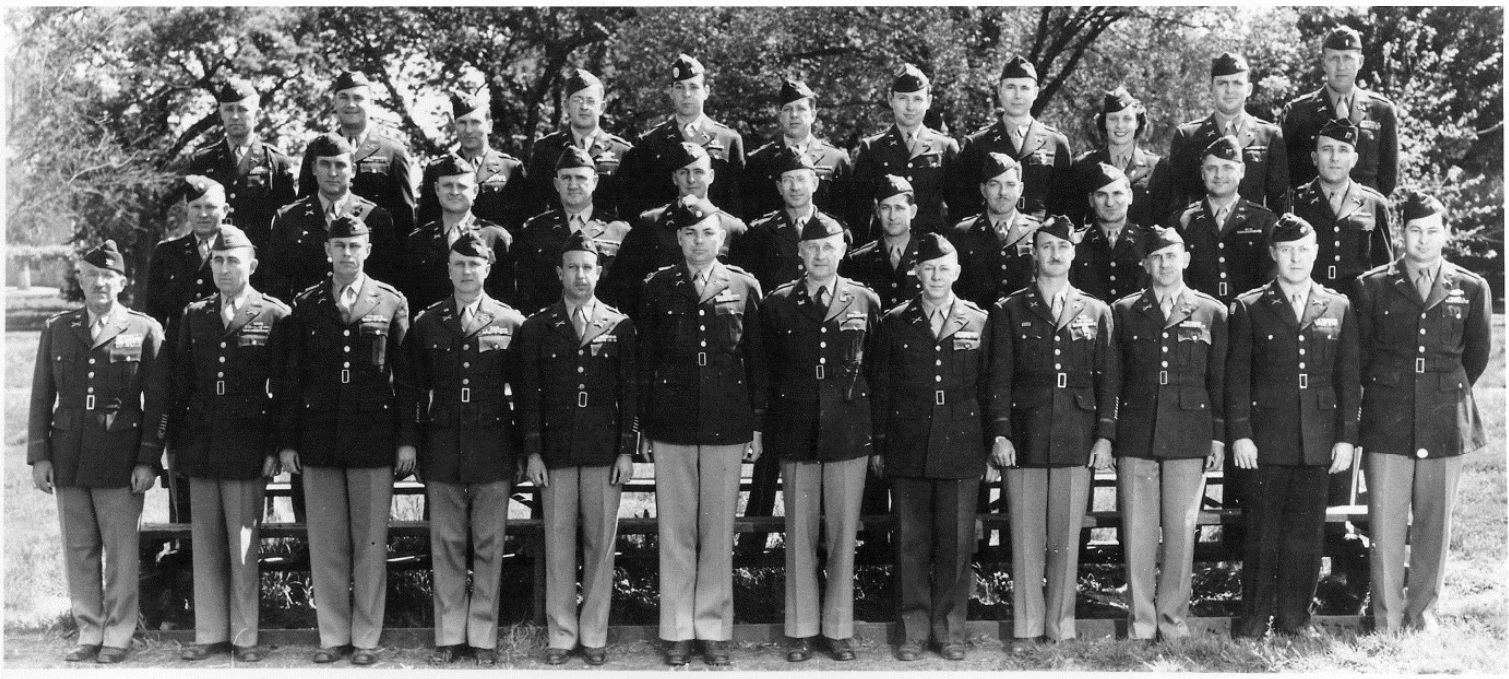
The US Army Ground Intelligence School faculty in 1946. Deputy commandant Oscar Koch is front, far left.

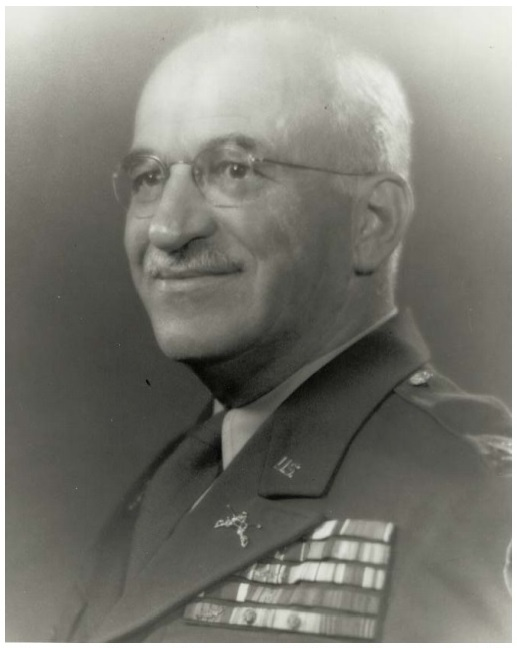
Oscar W. Koch, probably as commandant of the US Army Ground Intelligence School. Circa 1947.

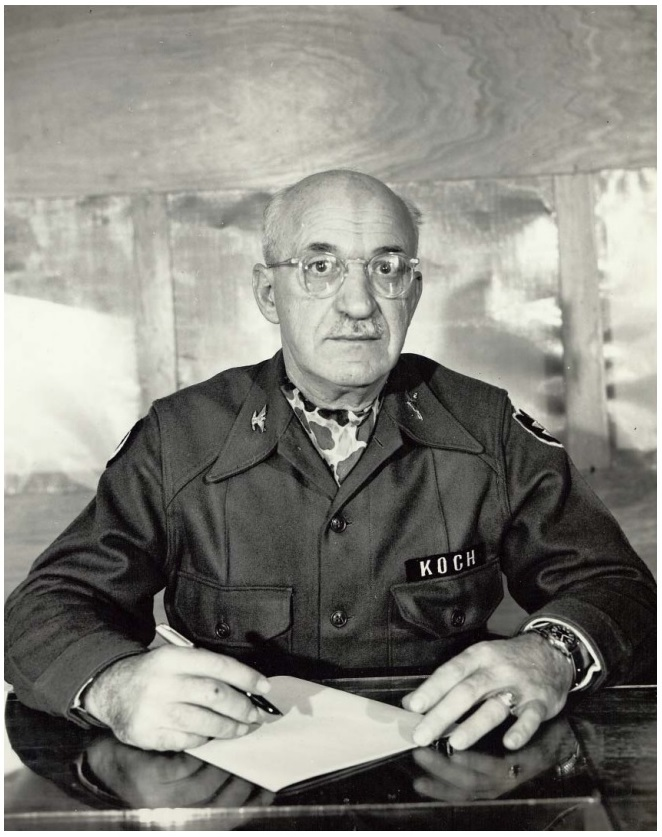
Oscar Koch as deputy commander of the 25th Infantry Division in early 1954

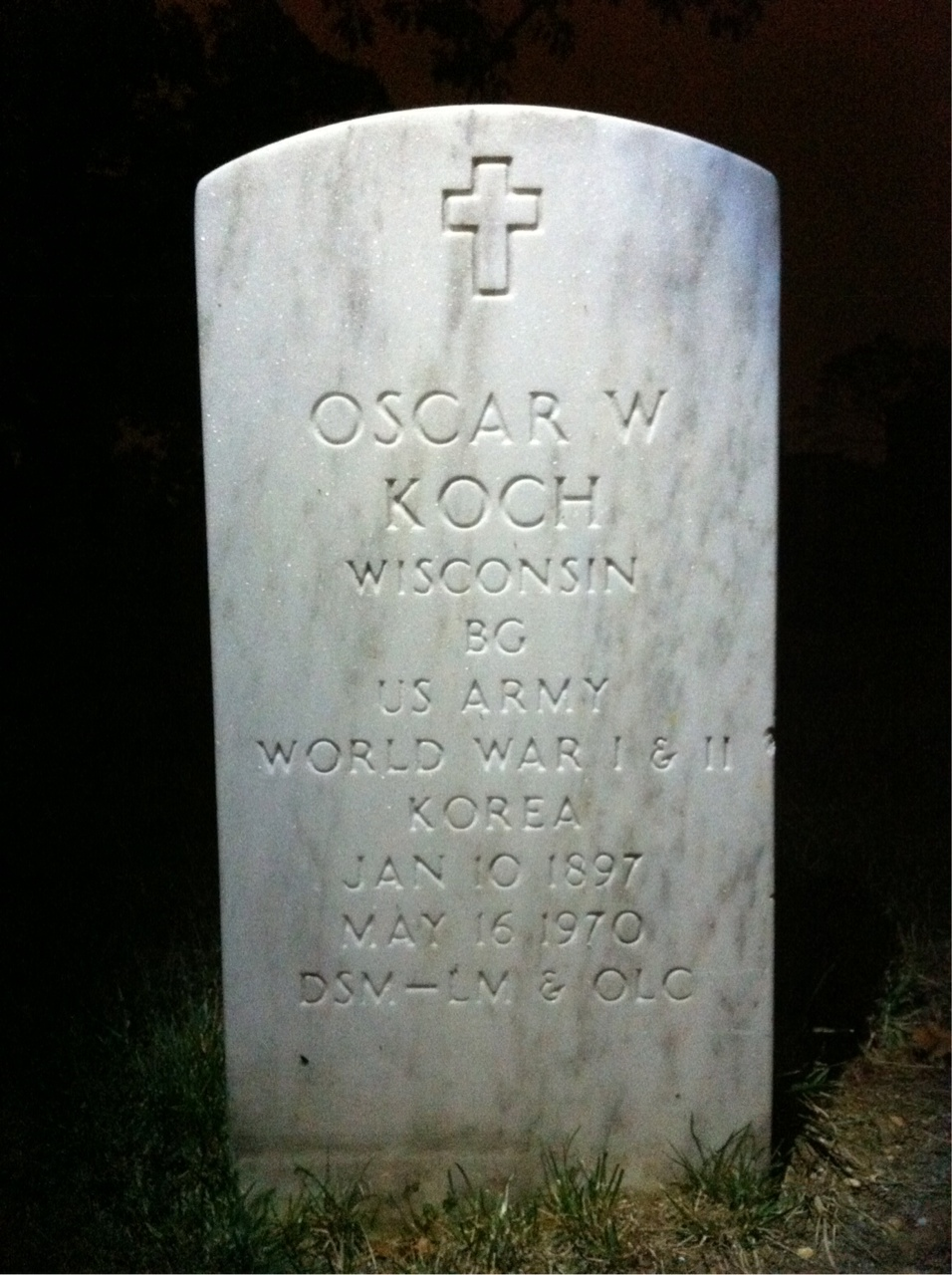
Gravestone of Oscar W. Koch at Arlington National Cemetery
