= Ernst Rabel =

Austrian-American legal scholar

- Born: January 28, 1874; Vienna, Austria-Hungary
- Died: September 7, 1955 (aged 81); Zürich, Switzerland
- Education: University of Vienna
- Occupation: Jurist

Ernst Rabel (January 28, 1874 – September 7, 1955) was an Austrian-born scholar of Roman law, German private law, and comparative law, who, as the founding director of the Kaiser Wilhelm Institute for Foreign and International Private Law, in Berlin, achieved international recognition in the period between the World Wars, before being forced into retirement under the Nazi regime, and immigrating to the United States, in 1939. In the field of comparative law his methodological perspectives, particularly as articulated and disseminated by his students, including Ernst von Caemmerer, Gerhard Kegel, and Max Rheinstein, were influential in the development of the "functional" or "function/context" methodology that became standard in Europe, the United States, and elsewhere in the world, in the post-World War II era. His work in Germany in the 1930s in the area of the law of the sale of goods provided a model for later postwar efforts to develop a uniform world-wide sales law.

== Biography ==
Ernst Rabel was born in Vienna, as the son of Albert Rabel and Bertha Rabel (née Ettinger). His father was a distinguished Austrian attorney in the era of the Austro-Hungarian Empire.

Rabel studied law at the University of Vienna, and received his Ph.D. there in December 1895. His dissertation, written under Ludwig Mitteis, was entitled "Die Übertragbarkeit des Urheberrechts nach dem österreichischen Gesetzes vom 26. December 1895" (The transferability of copyright under the Austrian act of December 26, 1895; published 1899). Rabel initially entered law practice with his father, in Vienna, but when his mentor Mitteis moved to Leipzig University in 1899, Rabel followed, and continued his studies there. Upon completion of his Habilitation, in 1902, with his work "Die Haftung des Verkäufers wegen Mangels im Rechte" (The seller's liability for failure to deliver conforming goods), he began teaching law at Leipzig University as a junior faculty member (Privatdozent), and in 1904 was appointed professor (extraordinarius) of Roman law and German private law.

In 1906, Rabel took up a post as a full professor (ordinarius) at the University of Basel. After a few years he returned to Germany, joining the law faculty at Kiel University in 1910, then at the University of Göttingen in 1911. It was at the Ludwig-Maximilians-Universität München, where he was appointed in 1916, that he shifted his focus from legal history to comparative law. He co-founded, with Karl Neumeyer, Munich's Institute for Comparative Law (Institut für Rechtsvergleichung), which was the first of its kind in Germany and served as a model for similar institutes later founded in Heidelberg, Frankfurt, and Hamburg. Most famously, his expertise in the field of comparative law led to his appointment, in 1926, as director of the newly created Kaiser Wilhelm Institute for Foreign and International Private Law (Kaiser-Wilhelm-Institut für ausländisches und internationales Privatrecht), in Berlin, one of the several independent research institutes founded by the Kaiser Wilhelm Society. In the postwar period it became the Max Planck Institute for Comparative and International Private Law (located in Hamburg beginning in 1956).

Rabel was also called upon to serve as a judge on several international judicial bodies during the interwar period. From 1921 to 1927, he was a judge for the German-Italian Mixed Arbitral Tribunal, which had jurisdiction over reparation claims against the German Empire, as well as controversies among private parties arising from contracts interrupted by wartime conditions; and from 1925 to 1928, he was an ad hoc judge on the Permanent Court of International Justice, serving in the Chorzów cases, among others. Later he served on the Permanent German-Italian (1928–1935) and German-Norwegian (1929–1936) Arbitral Commissions.

As a member of the governing council of the International Institute for the Unification of Private Law (UNIDROIT), from 1928 to 1933, Rabel initiated discussions concerning unification of rules of law for international sales transactions, which culminated in a report to the League of Nations in 1934. These efforts, as well as his own scholarly work on the law of the sale of goods (Das Recht des Warenkaufs, 1936), were a precursor to what became the proposed convention relating to a "Uniform Law on International Sales," adopted at a diplomatic conference in The Hague in 1964.

After the Nazis came to power in Germany, Rabel, though a lifelong Catholic, was eventually forced to resign his professorship in Berlin because of his Jewish heritage (his grandparents on both the maternal and paternal side were Jewish; his parents had converted to Catholicism). Having been employed in the German civil service since before the First World War (since his position in Leipzig in 1904), he initially fell under one of the exceptions in the Law for the Restoration of the Professional Civil Service of 1933, which forced many other Jews from their positions; however, his resignation was compelled under the terms of the Law of the Reich Citizen (Reichsbürgergesetz), part of the Nuremberg Laws, passed in 1935, which deprived Jews of German citizenship and eliminated once and for all the possibility of Jews serving in public office, or the civil service. In February 1937 he resigned as director of the Institute he had founded. He finally emigrated with his family via Belgium, to the United States, arriving in New York City in September 1939.

In the United States, he continued his work and supported himself through research grants that he received from the American Law Institute (ALI), the University of Michigan Law School, Ann Arbor, and Harvard Law School. In 1942, Rabel and German émigré colleague Karl Loewenstein were among those invited by the ALI to join an international experts' committee charged with preparing a global restatement of 'essential human rights.' The document that the ALI committee formulated later was an important point of reference in the drafting of the Universal Declaration of Human Rights by the United Nations.

After the war, while resident in the United States, Rabel completed what is considered to be his magnum opus, The Conflict of Laws: A Comparative Study, a four-volume work. At some point during this period he became an American citizen. He also spent time in Germany, both in Tübingen (where his old Institute had moved during the war), and in Berlin, where he taught at the Free University of Berlin.

While abroad, he died in a hospital in Zurich, Switzerland, on September 7, 1955.

== Personal life ==
Rabel's father, Albert Rabel, was originally from Austerlitz, Moravia (today Slavkov u Brna in the Czech Republic).

In 1912, Ernst Rabel married Anni Weber (1889–1979) in Göttingen. The couple had two children: a son, Friedrich Karl (born 1914), who, like his parents, immigrated to the United States via Belgium in 1939; and a daughter, Elisabeth ("Lilli"; 1913–1985), who followed the rest of the family to the United States in 1940.

== Selected works ==
In German

- Grundzüge des römischen Privatrechts [Outline of Roman private law] (1913)
- Das Recht des Warenkaufs [Law of the sale of goods] (1936)

In English

- The Conflict of Laws: A Comparative Study. 4 volumes (1945-1954; issued complete by the University of Michigan Law School, Ann Arbor, 1958)
- "The Private Laws of Western Civilization" (1949-1950). In four parts. Louisiana Law Review, vol. 10, no. 1-4. Based on lectures given by Rabel as a guest lecturer at the Louisiana State University in April–May 1949. Available at the Digital Commons of LSU Law Center: Part I, Part II - The French and Swiss Civil Codes, Part III - The German Civil Code, Part IV - Civil Law and Common Law
