= Cornelius Hurlbut Jr. =

American mineralogist (1906–2005)

Cornelius S. Hurlbut Jr.
- Born: Cornelius Searle Hurlbut Jr. June 30, 1906; Springfield, Massachusetts, U.S.
- Died: September 1, 2005 (aged 99); Lexington, Massachusetts, U.S.
- Education: Antioch College (BA; Harvard University (MA, PhD)
- Known for: Dana's Manual of Mineralogy; Minerals and Man; Gemology
- Spouses: Anne Dawson (m. 1932; died 1954) Margaret Richards Carver (m. 1956; died 2003)
- Children: 3
- Awards: Guggenheim Fellowship (1954); Neil Miner Award (1966); Carnegie Mineralogical Award (1993)
- Scientific career
- Fields: Mineralogy, gemology, petrology
- Institutions: Harvard University; Boston College
- Doctoral advisor: Esper Signius Larsen

Cornelius Searle Hurlbut Jr. (June 30, 1906 – September 1, 2005) was an American mineralogist and gemologist. He taught at Harvard University for four decades and served as chair of its Department of Mineralogy and Petrology.

Hurlbut is chiefly associated with Dana's Manual of Mineralogy. He rewrote the textbook for its fifteenth edition in 1941 and remained its author or coauthor through the 1990s, a span during which it served as the standard introductory text in English-language mineralogy teaching. He also wrote for general readers and, after retiring, turned to gemology, coauthoring one of the first textbooks in that field. The phosphate mineral hurlbutite was named for him in 1952.

== Early life and education ==
Hurlbut was born in Springfield, Massachusetts, on June 30, 1906. He was the son of Cornelius S. Hurlbut and Marion A. Hurlbut, both natives of Massachusetts.

He graduated from Antioch College with a BA in 1929, then entered Harvard for graduate study. He took an AM in 1931 and a PhD in 1933. His supervisor was the petrologist Esper S. Larsen Jr., who had joined the Harvard faculty in 1923 and was known for methods of identifying minerals under the petrographic microscope. Hurlbut wrote his dissertation on the Bonsall tonalite, an igneous body in San Diego County, California.

== Career ==
=== Harvard ===
Hurlbut joined the Harvard faculty in the early 1930s as a petrologist. Sources place the appointment in either 1932 or 1934. (Note: The Harvard memorial minute gives 1932, describing him as joining as a petrologist. The university's Collection of Historical Scientific Instruments gives 1934, describing the post as an instructorship in petrography.)

His field changed in 1934. Charles Palache, then curator of the Mineralogical Museum and professor of mineralogy, asked him to help teach the department's introductory mineralogy course. Palache retired in 1940, and Hurlbut took over the course. He continued to teach it until he retired in 1972.

He became full professor of mineralogy in 1954. (Note: The Writers Directory instead dates his professorship from 1940.) He chaired the Department of Mineralogy and Petrology from 1949 to 1960. After leaving Harvard he held a visiting professorship at Boston College from 1974 to 1977.

=== Research ===
Hurlbut worked on the crystal structures of minerals and on the mineralogy of granitic pegmatites, with particular attention to phosphates, borates, and beryllium-bearing species.

In 1936 he described bermanite, a manganese phosphate that he found associated with triplite in Arizona, as a species new to science. The type specimen went to the National Museum of Natural History by way of Harvard. His later work on the graftonite group established cell relationships among a set of pegmatite phosphates and was still being cited in structural studies decades afterward.

=== Textbooks and popular writing ===
Dana's Manual of Mineralogy descends from a textbook first issued by James Dwight Dana in 1848. Hurlbut took over the work from William E. Ford of Yale and produced a substantially rewritten fifteenth edition in 1941. He prepared three further editions alone, in 1952, 1959, and 1971. After retirement he worked with Cornelis Klein on the editions of 1977, 1985, and 1993, and Klein continued the book afterward with Barbara Dutrow under the title Manual of Mineral Science.

He also revised Edward S. Dana's Minerals and How to Study Them. He largely rewrote it in 1949 and updated it again with W. Edwin Sharp in 1998.

Hurlbut wrote for general audiences as well. Minerals and Man, an illustrated survey published in 1968, was selected by the American Library Association as one of its notable books of the year. With Henry E. Wenden he wrote The Changing Science of Mineralogy in 1964, and in 1978 he edited The Planet We Live On, an illustrated encyclopedia of the earth sciences.

=== Gemology ===
Hurlbut's interest in gemstones dates to the 1940s, when he joined the educational advisory board of the Gemological Institute of America. Gemology became his main field after he left Harvard, and he taught a course on the subject in the Boston area in the early 1970s.

With George Switzer of the Smithsonian Institution he wrote Gemology, published in 1979 and regarded as the first textbook treatment of the discipline. A second edition followed in 1991, written with Robert C. Kammerling, and covered synthesis, imitation stones, and treatments used to alter color and clarity. Hurlbut sat on the editorial board of Gems & Gemology, the quarterly journal of the Gemological Institute, from 1981 until his death.

== Honors ==
In 1952 the mineralogist Mary E. Mrose described a calcium beryllium phosphate, CaBe_{2}(PO_{4})_{2}, from the Smith mine at Chandlers Mill near Newport, New Hampshire. She named it hurlbutite for Hurlbut, noting that the name suited his work on beryllium-bearing minerals. The mineral is orthorhombic, colorless to greenish white, and occurs in the pegmatite as an alteration product of beryl. Type material is held at Harvard.

Hurlbut served as secretary of the Mineralogical Society of America from 1945 to 1958 and as its president in 1963. He was a longtime member of the Geological Society of America and the American Academy of Arts and Sciences.

He held a Guggenheim Fellowship in the earth sciences. (Note: Dated 1954 by the Harvard memorial minute and 1955 by other accounts.) The National Association of Geoscience Teachers gave him the Neil Miner Award in 1966, an award for contributions that stimulate interest in the earth sciences. He received the Carnegie Mineralogical Award, which recognizes contributions to mineralogy by individuals or institutions, in the early 1990s. (Note: Dated 1993 by the Harvard memorial minute and 1994 by other accounts.)

== Personal life and death ==
Hurlbut married Anne Dawson in 1932. They had three children, Neil, Patricia, and Marcus, and she died in 1954. He married Margaret Richards Carver in 1956, and she died in 2003. He played tennis into his nineties and wrote poetry.

He died at his home in Lexington, Massachusetts, on September 1, 2005, at the age of 99. He was survived by two of his children, six grandchildren, and six great-grandchildren. A memorial reception was held in Lexington on November 5, 2005. The Harvard Faculty of Arts and Sciences placed a memorial minute on his life in its permanent records on December 6, 2022.

== Selected publications ==
- Hurlbut, Cornelius S. Jr. (1936). "A new phosphate, bermanite, occurring with triplite in Arizona". American Mineralogist. 21: 656–661.
- Dana, James Dwight; Hurlbut, Cornelius S. Jr. (1941). Dana's Manual of Mineralogy (15th ed.). New York: John Wiley & Sons.
- Dana, Edward Salisbury; Hurlbut, Cornelius S. Jr. (1949). Minerals and How to Study Them (3rd ed.). New York: John Wiley & Sons.
- Hurlbut, Cornelius S. Jr.; Wenden, Henry E. (1964). The Changing Science of Mineralogy. Boston: D. C. Heath.
- Hurlbut, Cornelius S. Jr. (1968). Minerals and Man. New York: Random House.
- Hurlbut, Cornelius S. Jr., ed. (1978). The Planet We Live On: An Illustrated Encyclopedia of the Earth Sciences. New York: Harry N. Abrams. ISBN 978-0-8109-1088-9.
- Hurlbut, Cornelius S. Jr.; Switzer, George S. (1979). Gemology. New York: John Wiley & Sons. ISBN 978-0-471-02795-9.
- Hurlbut, Cornelius S. Jr.; Kammerling, Robert C. (1991). Gemology (2nd ed.). New York: John Wiley & Sons. ISBN 978-0-471-52667-4.
- Klein, Cornelis; Hurlbut, Cornelius S. Jr. (1993). Manual of Mineralogy (after James D. Dana) (21st ed.). New York: John Wiley & Sons. ISBN 978-0-471-57452-1.
