= Interpreter's Bible series =

The Interpreter's Bible series is a biblical criticism series published by United Methodist Publishing (Abingdon/Cokesbury) beginning in the 1950s. Each volume covers one or more books of the Old Testament (including the Apocrypha) or the New Testament.

Between 1994 and 1998, an updated 12-volume series was published by Abingdon Press as The New Interpreter's Bible (NIB). The New International Version and the New Revised Standard Version are used in parallel as translations and the series contains the work of 94 authors and 14 consultants.
