= Faculty of Arts and Sciences =

Faculty of Arts of Sciences may refer to:

- Faculty of Arts and Sciences (Yale)
- Faculty of Arts and Sciences (Queen's University)
- Faculty of Arts and Science (University of Toronto)
- Faculty of Arts and Sciences (Harvard)
- Faculty of Arts and Sciences (University of Pennsylvania)
- Faculty of Arts and Sciences Building, Istanbul University
