= Fritz Morstein Marx =

German-American political and administrative scientist

Fritz Morstein Marx or F. M. Marx (February 23, 1900 – October 9, 1969) was a German-American political and administrative scientist.

== History ==
Fritz Marx was born in Hamburg on February 23, 1900. He studied law after a short military service in the First World War. In 1922 he was awarded his doctorate at the University of Hamburg and then entered the Administration Service of the Free and Hanseatic City of Hamburg. In 1930–31 he did research in the United States, funded by scholarships from the Rockefeller Foundation. In 1933 he emigrated to the US after the National Socialists came to power. He then worked in academia and as an administrator. From 1942 to 1960 he was a member of the US president's Bureau of the Budget. During this time he was also a research professor at Princeton University. From 1960 to 1962 he was dean at Hunter College in New York City.

In 1962 Morstein Marx returned to Germany and became Professor of Comparative Public Administration and Public Law at the University of Administrative Sciences in Speyer.

He retired in 1968 but continued teaching until his death. He died on October 9, 1969, in Baden-Baden.

== Selected publications ==
- The Administrative State: An Introduction To Bureaucracy, 1969.
- Elements of Public Administration ... edited [and in part written] by F. M. Marx. Second Edition, 1959.
- Comparative Administrative Law: Economic Improvisation by Public Authorities, 1940.

== Sources ==
1. Margrit Seckelmann, Die Geburt der Verwaltungswissenschaft aus dem Geiste der Demokratie: Fritz Morstein Marx (1900-1969), in: Carsten Kremer (ed.), Die Verwaltungsrechtswissenschaft der frühen Bundesrepublik 1949–1977. In print. (German Language)
2. Margrit Seckelmann, ‘Mit Feuereifer für die öffentliche Verwaltung‘: Fritz Morstein Marx – Die frühen Jahre (1900-1933), in: Die Öffentliche Verwaltung 66 (2013), p. 401-415. (German Language)
3. Margrit Seckelmann, ‘Mit seltener Objektivität‘: Fritz Morstein Marx – Die mittleren Jahre (1934-1961), in: Die Öffentliche Verwaltung 67 (2014), p. 1029-1048. (German Language)
4. Margrit Seckelmann, ‘Mit Verständnis für den Verwaltungsmann‘: Fritz Morstein Marx – Die späten Jahre (1962-1969), in: Die Öffentliche Verwaltung 2015. In print. (German Language)
