= Jane Costello (writer) =

British writer

Jane Costello (born 1974) is the pen name of journalist and former newspaper editor Jane Wolstenholme. She is best known for a series of novels in the romantic comedy genre.

== Life and career ==
Costello grew up in Liverpool and became a journalist on the Liverpool Echo and Daily Post titles, rising to Editor of the Daily Post. She left in 2006 to pursue her writing career. Costello also writes books under a separate pseudonym, Catherine Isaac.

== Books ==
- Bridesmaids (2008)
- The Nearly Weds (2010)
- My Single Friend (2010)
- Girl on the Run (2011)
- All The Single Ladies (2013)
- The Wish List (2013)
- The Mini Break (2014)
- The Love Shack (2015)
- Summer Nights at the Moonlight Hotel (2016)
- Forty Love (2025)
