= Peter Reed Morrison =

Peter Reed Morrison (11 November 1919, Washington, DC – 22 March 2019) was a professor of animal physiology and a Guggenheim Fellow for the academic year 1954–1955.

== Early life ==
Morrison graduated in 1940 with a B.S. from Swarthmore College and graduated in 1947 with a Ph.D. from Harvard University. He became a physiology and biology professor at the University of Wisconsin–Madison. Peter was also a professor of zoophysiology at the University of Alaska Fairbanks (UAF) from 1963 to 1974. Since then, he retired as professor emeritus. He was also the director of UAF's Institute of Arctic Biology from 1966 to 1974.

... fibrin film ... developed chiefly by the beautiful work of John D. Ferry and Peter R. Morrison ... proved to be the first really safe and effective replacement for the dural membrane lining the brain after some of the latter had been removed in an operation.

== Selected publications ==
- Ferry, John D.; Morrison, Peter R. (1944). "Chemical, clinical, and immunological studies on the products of human plasma fractionation. XVI. Fibrin clots, fibrin films, and fibrinogen plastics" (PDF). The Journal of Clinical Investigation. 23 (4): 566–572. doi:10.1172/JCI101523. PMC 435372. PMID 16695134.
- Ferry, John D.; Morrison, Peter R. (1947). "Preparation and Properties of Serum and Plasma Proteins. VIII. The Conversion of Human Fibrinogen to Fibrin under Various Conditions1,2". Journal of the American Chemical Society. 69 (2): 388–400. doi:10.1021/ja01194a066. PMID 20292443.
- Morrison, Peter R. (1947). "Preparation and Properties of Serum and Plasma Proteins. XV. Some Factors Influencing the Quantitative Determination of Fibrinogen1,2". Journal of the American Chemical Society. 69 (11): 2723–2731. doi:10.1021/ja01203a047. PMID 20270820.
- Morrison, Peter R. (1948). "Oxygen consumption in several small wild mammals". Journal of Cellular and Comparative Physiology. 31 (1): 69–96. doi:10.1002/jcp.1030310106. PMID 18898524.
- Morrison, Peter R.; Edsall, John T.; Miller, Susan G. (1948). "Preparation and Properties of Serum and Plasma Proteins. XVIII. The Separation of Purified Fibrinogen from Fraction I of Human Plasma". Journal of the American Chemical Society. 70 (9): 3103–3108. doi:10.1021/ja01189a080. PMID 18882550.
- Edsall, John T.; Edelhoch, Harold; Lontie, René; Morrison, Peter R. (1950). "Light Scattering in Solutions of Serum Albumin: Effects of Charge and Ionic Strength1,2". Journal of the American Chemical Society. 72 (10): 4641–4656. doi:10.1021/ja01166a085.
- Morrison, P. R.; Ryser, F. A. (1952). "Weight and Body Temperature in Animals". Science. 116 (3009): 231–232. Bibcode:1952Sci...116..231M. doi:10.1126/science.116.3009.231. PMID 17770935.
- Morrison, Peter R.; Ryser, Fred A.; Strecker, Robert L. (1954). "Growth and the Development of Temperature Regulation in the Tundra Redback Vole". Journal of Mammalogy. 35 (3): 376. doi:10.2307/1375962. JSTOR 1375962.
- Morrison, Peter R.; Tietz, William J. (1957). "Cooling and Thermal Conductivity in Three Small Alaskan Mammals". Journal of Mammalogy. 38 (1): 78–86. doi:10.2307/1376478. JSTOR 1376478.
- Dawe, A.R.; Morrison, P.R. (1955). "Characteristics of the hibernating heart". American Heart Journal. 49 (3): 367–384. doi:10.1016/0002-8703(55)90031-4. PMID 14349852.
- Robinson, Kathleen W.; Morrison, Peter R. (1957). "The reaction to hot atmospheres of various species of Australian marsupial and placental animals". Journal of Cellular and Comparative Physiology. 49 (3): 455–478. doi:10.1002/jcp.1030490306. PMID 13481078.
- Galster, W.; Morrison, PR (1975). "Gluconeogenesis in arctic ground squirrels between periods of hibernation". American Journal of Physiology. Legacy Content. 228 (1): 325–330. doi:10.1152/ajplegacy.1975.228.1.325. PMID 1147024.

== Patents ==
- Ferry, J.D. and Morrison, P.R., 1950. Fibrin clots and methods for preparing the same. U.S. Patent 2,533,004.
- Ferry, J.D. and Morrison, P.R., Research Corp, 1951. Methods of forming shaped fibrin products. U.S. Patent 2,576,006.
