= Jane Costello (art historian) =

American art historian

- Born: Jane Costello; January 5, 1919; New York City, U.S.
- Died: 1980s
- Occupation: Art historian
- Spouse: Arthur Goldberg (died)
- Awards: Guggenheim Fellowship (1953)

Academic background
- Education: Barnard College; New York University
- Thesis: Nicolas Poussin and the Genesis of French Classicism (1951)
- Doctoral advisor: Walter Friedländer

Academic work
- Discipline: Art history
- Sub-discipline: Nicolas Poussin
- Institutions: New York University

Jane Costello Goldberg (January 5, 1919 – 1980s) was an American art historian. A 1953 Guggenheim Fellow, she specialized in French art, particularly the work of Nicolas Poussin. She spent decades working as a professor at New York University, where she had previously obtained her graduate degrees. She also taught two courses on the television series Sunrise Semester in the 1960s.

== Biography ==
Jane Costello was born on January 5, 1919, in New York City. Raised in Brooklyn, she attended Erasmus Hall High School. She obtained a BA from Barnard College in 1940, and later worked at the Metropolitan Museum of Art as a lecturer from 1943 to 1946. She later attended New York University, where she obtained an MA in 1946 and PhD in 1951. Her doctoral dissertation Nicolas Poussin and the Genesis of French Classicism was supervised by Walter Friedländer, and it was published in the Journal of the Warburg Institute alongside her master thesis The Twelve Pictures Ordered by Velasquez and the Trial of Valguarnera.

Costello later remained in NYU, where she was instructor of art from 1951 to 1953, when she was promoted to assistant professor. She eventually became Helen Gould Sheppard Professor of Fine Arts. In addition to French art, she taught Dutch and Flemish Renaissance painting and ancient Egyptian art, co-developing NYU's first undergraduate course on the latter. She also worked as an art history teacher at Parsons School of Design. Outside of teaching, she was vice-president of NYU's American Association of University Professors chapter, as well as a member of NYU's university senate.

As an art historian, Costello specialized in French art and Baroque art, especially Nicolas Poussin. She was one of the collaborators on the Warburg Institute's catalogue raisonné on Poussin. In 1953, she was awarded a Guggenheim Fellowship to study Poussin's drawings. Her work shifted towards festschrifts during her later career, though she did work on the 1975 book Nicolas Poussin: The Martyrdom of Saint Erasmus, published by the National Gallery of Canada, and make plans about a book on French art (which never materialized by the time of her death).

In addition to in-person teaching, Costello was a television lecturer on WCBS-TV's Sunrise Semester series. She had a months-long tenure on the show lasting from February to June 1960, where her course was called "Outlines of the History of Art". She also joined the American Federation of Television and Radio Artists before her appearances aired, and she received union letters. She later made her second appearance on Sunrise Semester for the nationally-broadcast 1963-1964 season, teaching art history. Gay Pauley of United Press International said that in her appearances on the show, Costello looked like Jane Wyman and wore fake eyelashes.

Amidst a period of declining health, Costello retired from full-time teaching in 1981 and eventually from NYU in 1985. She later died afterwards, sometime before March 1987. The NYU College of Arts and Science' Jane Costello Prize was named after her.

Costello was married to lawyer Arthur I. Goldberg until his death. She left her husband's collection of African art to MOMA.

== Works ==
- An Outline of the History of Art (1959)
- (translated from the Italian of Mario Attilio Levi) Political Power in the Ancient World (1966)
