= Gerard R. Wyatt =

American-Canadian biochemist and entomologist (1925–2019)

Gerard Robert Wyatt (3 September 1925, in Palo Alto, California – 28 March 2019, in Kingston, Ontario) was an American-Canadian biochemist and entomologist, specializing in insect physiology. He is known for important research on DNA.

== Biography ==
Gerard Wyatt, as a boy of age eight with his family, immigrated to Canada. He attended Victoria College but transferred to the University of British Columbia, where he graduated in 1945 with a bachelor's degree in zoology. He then worked for a year at the UC Berkeley laboratory of Edward Steinhaus, an expert on insect-transmitted pathogens. In 1946 Wyatt returned to Canada to work at the new Laboratory of Insect Pathology in Sault Ste. Marie, Ontario. From 1947 to 1950 he was a research student in biochemistry at the Molteno Institute in Cambridge, England. He received his PhD from the University of Cambridge. In 1950 he returned to Ontario to work at the Laboratory of Insect Pathology. Wyatt was a Guggenheim Fellow for the academic year 1954–1955. From 1954 to 1973 he was a member of the faculty of Yale University. There he did important research on the biochemistry of insect hemolymph and sugars and polysaccharides in insects. From 1973 until his retirement in 1994, he was a professor at Queen's University at Kingston. There he started an African migratory locust facility. (Because of Canada's cold climate, African locusts were not regarded as an invasive species threat.) In 1990 Wyatt became the scientific director of Insect Biotech Canada, with 25 scientists working as a team on insect control.

He was elected a Fellow of the Royal Society of Canada in 1981.

In 1950 Wyatt married Sarah Silver Morton, who died in 1981. Upon his death he was survived by his second wife, three children from his first marriage, as well as two step-children, and several grandchildren and great-grandchildren.

== Research on DNA ==
During the late 1940s and early 1950s Gerard Wyatt studied the ratios of the four DNA bases - adenine, guanine, thymine and cytosine - in eukaryotic cells. His observation that in DNA there is always the same amount of adenine as thymine, and the same amount of cytosine as guanine, was critical to the idea, eventually developed by James Watson, that pairs of bases were somehow linked in the DNA structure. Erwin Chargaff at Columbia University independently made the same observation, often called 'Chargaff ratios' or 'Chargaff's rules'. However, Wyatt was thought by some to use better techniques; he also confirmed the presence of 5-methylcytosine in the DNAs of some organisms, which revised the ratios in those species to bring them nearer to 1. His work is cited both in Watson and Crick's 1953 'Nature' paper and in Watson's 1968 book, 'The Double Helix'.

According to James D. Watson:

A key piece of information was picked up at the Institut Pasteur. There I ran into Gerry Wyatt, a Canadian biochemist who knew much about the base ratios of DNA. He had just analyzed the DNA from the T_{2}, T_{4}, and T_{6} group of phages. For the past two years this DNA was said to have the strange property of lacking cytosine, a feature obviously impossible for our model. But Wyatt now said that he, together with Seymour Cohen and Al Hershey, had evidence that these phages contained a modified type of cytosine called 5-hydroxy-methyl cytosine. Most important, its amount equalled the amount of guanine. This beautifully supported the double helix ...

== Sources ==
- Gerard Robert Wyatt's personal papers archive is available for study at the Wellcome Collection, London (some of the material is digitised and digitally accessible via the website).
