= Ionospheric heater =

Radio wave transmitter

An ionospheric heater, or an ionospheric HF pump facility, is a powerful radio wave transmitter with an array of antennas which is used for research of plasma turbulence, the ionosphere, and the upper atmosphere.

== Objectives and techniques ==
These transmitters operate in the high frequency (HF) range (3-30 MHz) at which radio waves are reflected from the ionosphere back to the ground. With such facilities a range of plasma turbulence phenomena can be excited in a semi-controlled fashion from the ground, during conditions when the ionosphere is naturally quiet and not perturbed by for example aurora. This stimulus-response type of research complements passive observations of naturally excited phenomena to learn about the ionosphere and upper atmosphere.

The plasma turbulence phenomena that are studied include different types of nonlinear wave interactions, in which different waves in the plasma couple and interact with the transmitted radio wave, formation and self organization of filamentary plasma structures, as well as electron acceleration. The turbulence is diagnosed by for example incoherent scatter radar, by detecting the weak electromagnetic emissions from the turbulence and optical emissions. The optical emissions result from the excitation of atmospheric atoms and molecules by electrons that have been accelerated in the plasma turbulence. As this process is the same as for the aurora, the optical emission excited by HF waves have sometimes been referred to as artificial aurora, although sensitive cameras are needed to detect these emissions, which is not the case for the real aurora.

Ionospheric HF pump facilities need to be sufficiently powerful to provide the possibility for plasma turbulence studies, although any radio wave that propagates in the ionosphere affects it by heating the electrons. It had been discovered as early as the 1930s with the Luxemburg effect that radio waves affect the ionosphere in this manner. Although the research facilities need to have powerful transmitters, the power flux in the ionosphere for the most powerful facility (HAARP) is below 0.03 W/m^{2}. This gives an energy density in the ionosphere that is less than 1/100 of the thermal energy density of the ionospheric plasma itself. The power flux may also be compared with the solar flux at the Earth's surface of about 1.5 kW/m^{2}. During aurora generally no ionospheric effects can be observed with the HF pump facilities as the radio wave power is strongly absorbed by the naturally heated ionosphere.

== Current HF pump facilities ==
- EISCAT-Heating operated by the European Incoherent Scatter Scientific Association (EISCAT) at Ramfjordmoen near Tromsø in Norway, capable of transmitting 1.2 MW or over 1 GW effective radiated power (ERP).
- Sura ionospheric heating facility in Vasilsursk near Nizhniy Novgorod in Russia, capable of transmitting 750 kW or 190 MW ERP.
- High Frequency Active Auroral Research Program (HAARP) north of Gakona, Alaska, capable of transmitting 3.6 MW or 4 GW ERP.

== Closed HF pump facilities ==
- Arecibo Observatory (Puerto Rico) also had a HF facility for ionospheric modification. Arecibo was decommissioned in 2020.
- HIgh Power Auroral Stimulation Observatory HIPAS Observatory northeast of Fairbanks, Alaska, USA, capable of transmitting 1.2 MW or 70 MW ERP. Closed 2007.
- Islote ionospheric heater, (Puerto Rico) operated until 1998, located in Islote.
- Platteville Atmospheric Observatory, Colorado, USA (stopped ionospheric heater research in 1984 but still operates as an atmospheric observatory).
- SPEAR (Space Plasma Exploration by Active Radar) is an installation operated by UNIS (the University Centre in Svalbard) adjacent to the EISCAT facilities at Longyearbyen in Svalbard, Norway, capable of transmitting 192 kW or 28 MW ERP.
