= William E. Gordon =

American astronomer

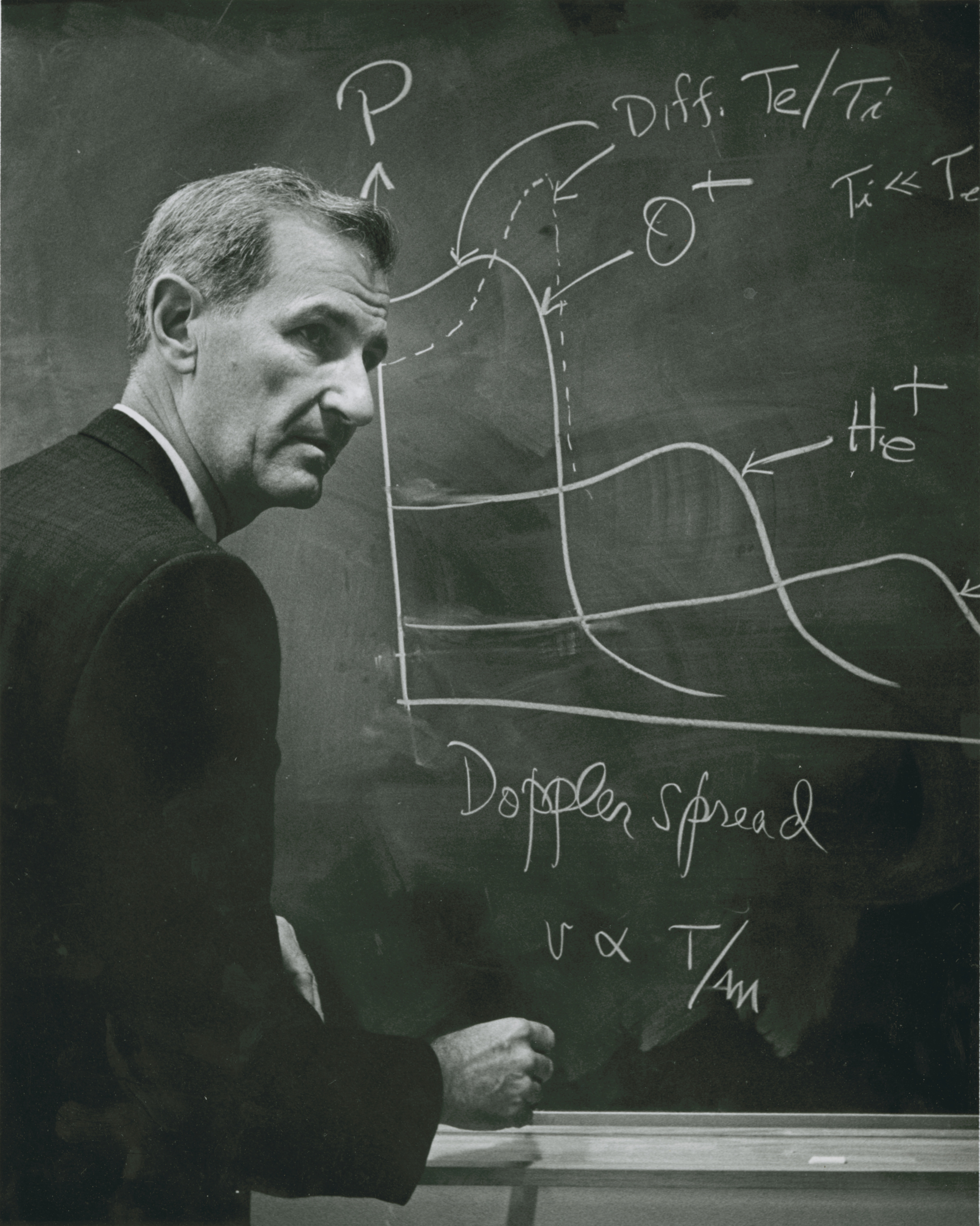
- Gordon in 1980
- Born: William Edwin Gordon; January 8, 1918; Paterson, New Jersey, U.S.
- Died: February 16, 2010 (aged 92); Ithaca, New York, U.S.
- Education: Cornell University
- Occupations: Physicist; Astronomer
- Known for: Designing the largest radio telescope
- Spouse(s): Elva Gordon; Elizabeth (Lizzie)
- Awards: Arctowski Medal (1984)
- Scientific career
- Fields: engineering, space science, astronomy
- Workplaces: Cornell University; Arecibo Observatory; Rice University
- Doctoral advisor: Henry G. Booker

William Edwin Gordon (January 8, 1918 – February 16, 2010) was an electrical engineer, physicist and astronomer. He was referred to as the "father of the Arecibo Observatory".

== Biography ==
William E. Gordon was an Electrical Engineer. He was born in Paterson, New Jersey, on January 8, 1918, and attended public schools in Totowa, New Jersey. Gordon worked his way through Montclair State Teachers College, graduating with a B.A. degree. Before World War II, he taught junior high schools in Mendham and Oradell, New Jersey.

In 1941, he married Elva Freile with whom he had two children, Larry and Nancy.

Gordon served in the Army Air Corps (Private to captain) from 1941 to 1945, studying and teaching meteorology at New York University and experimenting with radar coverage under conditions of mirage and looming. He continued the work at the Electrical Engineering Research Labs at the University of Texas, before moving to Cornell University, where he received a Ph.D. degree in electrical engineering in 1953. He was a faculty member at Cornell University from 1953 to 1965. He joined the faculty of Rice University in 1966, serving as dean of science and Engineering, Dean of Natural Sciences, and Provost and Vice President.

Gordon wanted to study the properties of the Earth's upper atmosphere, the ionosphere, and thought that he could use a radar system to measure the density and temperature in this difficult-to-study atmospheric region. His calculations indicated that an antenna approximately 305 meters (1,000 ft) in diameter would do the job, but would be far too expensive to build using existing designs for radio and radar antennas. He oversaw the design of the radio telescope and its construction in the karst foothills just south of Arecibo, Puerto Rico. At its fortieth anniversary, it was named both a "Milestone in Electrical Engineering and Computing" and also a "Mechanical Engineering Landmark."

He served as the Director of the resultant Arecibo Ionospheric Observatory from 1960 to 1965. Encouraged by work at the Platteville Atmospheric Observatory, Gordon was influential in getting an ionospheric heater built at Islote, about 30 km from the Arecibo Observatory, which operated until 1998 when it was destroyed by Hurricane Georges.

In 1966 he moved to Rice University to become dean of science and Engineering and a faculty member of both the Department of Space Science (later Space Physics and Astronomy) and the Department of Electrical and Computer Engineering. He subsequently served as vice president and Provost. He guided 12 doctoral dissertations while serving as administrator.

He retired in 1986 to become Distinguished Professor Emeritus of Space Physics and Astronomy and of Electrical and Computer Engineering at Rice University. He was a member of many respected professional and academic societies, including the National Academy of Sciences (since 1968) and National Academy of Engineering (since 1975). In 1984 Gordon was awarded the Arctowski Medal from the National Academy of Sciences. He was a Fellow of the American Academy of Arts and Sciences, (since 1986).

He died in Ithaca, New York, on February 16, 2010, at the age of 92.
