= Platteville =

There are a few places named Platteville in the United States:

- Platteville, Colorado
- Platteville, Wisconsin, a city
- Platteville (town), Wisconsin
- Platteville Atmospheric Observatory Ionospheric heating facility
