= Fusion torch =

Use of high-energy plasma from fusion reactors to separate elements for reuse

A fusion torch is a technique for utilizing the high-temperature plasma of a fusion reactor to break apart other materials (especially waste materials) and convert them into a few reusable and saleable elements. It was invented in 1968 by Bernard J. Eastlund and William C. Gough while they were program managers of the controlled thermonuclear research program of the United States Atomic Energy Commission (AEC). The basic concept was to impinge the plasma leaking from fusion reactors onto solids or liquids, vaporizing, dissociating and ionizing the materials, then separating the resulting elements into separate bins for collection. Other applications of fusion plasmas such as generation of UV and optical light, and generation of hydrogen fuel, were also described in their associated 1969 paper.

== How it works ==
The process began with a tokamak, a doughnut-shaped magnetic "bottle", containing plasma and unwanted material. This combination would result in a pool of electrons and nuclei which in turn would cause the tokamak to overflow and transfer the plasma into an outlet. This plasma then passes through a series of metal plates, differing in particular temperatures, all arranged in descending order. The atoms of elements pass over the plates with boiling points above their own. Eventually, the atoms encounter plates where the temperature is lower than their boiling point. This makes them stick onto the plate. The plates then work as a distillation system which sorts the plasma into its constituent elements. These pure elements can then be reused.

== 1969 paper ==
In the paper "The Fusion Torch – Closing the Cycle from Use to Reuse", Bernard J. Eastlund and William C. Gough defined population (food), entropy (resources, energy, pollution), and war (human needs and behavior) as three traps that could hamper the advancement of mankind.

The use of the fusion torch in conjunction with controlled fusion power offers a potential solution to the entropy trap in materials. - i.e. man's exhaustion of nature's stored resources. (Eastlund & Gough, 1969)

In terms of energy needs they estimated that by the year 2000 they would need 140,000 megawatts of electrical capacity. They also speculated that the fusion torch concept would be useful for the separation of uranium from reactor fuel element material.
