= Bernard Eastlund =

American physicist

Bernard J. Eastlund (1938 – December 12, 2007) was an American physicist who received his B.S. in physics from Massachusetts Institute of Technology (MIT) and his Ph.D. in physics from Columbia University. In 1970 he received a Special Achievement Certificate from the U. S. Atomic Energy Commission for co-invention of the "fusion torch."

== Career ==
Eastlund attended MIT, receiving a B.S Physics degree in 1960. In 1965, he received a Ph.D. in plasma physics from Columbia University, and spent 3 years as a post-doc fellow there. Eastlund became a staff member at the fusion office at the U.S. Atomic Energy Commission (USAEC) in 1968. The USAEC recognized Eastlund's paper, "The Fusion Torch" co-authored with William C. Gough, with a Special Award in 1970. Scientific American magazine published a review of fusion programs by Eastland and Gough in 1971.

In 1974, Eastlund left the USAEC and co-founded Fusion Systems Corporation, which focused on ultraviolet-based curing technology with applications in the packaging and manufacturing industry. Fusion Systems technology was used for fast-drying industrial requirements such as labels on Coors beer cans and furniture varnishes. The company sold in 1997 for $193 million.

In 1979, Eastlund left Fusion Systems to become vice president of energy research for BDM Corporation. Eastlund served as a member of the board of directors and also as treasurer at Fusion Power Associates. After leaving BDM, Eastlund worked for Atlantic Richfield Corporation. In 1987 he founded Production Technologies International Corporation and in 1996 he founded Eastlund Scientific Enterprises Corporation. In 2003, Eastlund was awarded a U.S. House of Representatives Certificate of Recognition for contributions to homeland security technology.

Eastlund was in favor of funding research into weather modification and control that could reduce the impact of severe weather. He envisioned "concepts for electromagnetic wave interactions with the atmosphere that, among a range of jobs, could be applied to weather modification research" and that such research could mature to a new science in 10 or 20 years.

He was active in astrophysics, and later work included co-authoring papers regarding pulsars and gamma bursters presented in the Astrophysical Journal and at scientific symposiums.

In later years, he continued to collaborate with Gough and George Miley on their fusion torch concepts. Eastlund died December 12, 2007, at his home in St. Louis, survived by his wife, Sherrie, and several children.

== Patents ==
Eastlund authored 53 peer reviewed scientific papers and 23 US patents for applications such as well-drilling, sterilization of medical devices, high intensity lighting, and atmospheric plasma heating.

One of Eastlund's patents (US4686605 A) described an adaptation of concepts first proposed by Nikola Tesla. Eastlund's "Method and apparatus for altering a region in the earth's atmosphere, ionosphere, and/or magnetosphere", described as "grandiose", proposed a 40-mile square radio transmitter that used Alaskan natural gas to generate current to create electromagnetic radiation that would excite a section of the ionosphere. Eastlund's patent speculated on "possible ramifications and potential future developments" including magnetotelluric surveys, local weather modification, and missile defense. Eastlund later claimed that HAARP was built using his patents, prompting conspiracy theorists such as Nick Begich to claim that HAARP is capable of secretly controlling the weather. According to HAARP program manager John L. Heckscher, "HAARP certainly does not have anything to do with Eastlund's thing, that is just crazy. What we have here is a premier scientific research facility with military applications."
