= Granville Beynon =

Welsh physicist

Sir William John Granville Beynon, CBE, FRS (24 May 1914 in Dunvant – 11 March 1996 in Aberystwyth) was a Welsh physicist. He co-operated with Sir Edward Victor Appleton, who had detected the terrestrial Ionosphere.

== Life history ==
William John Granville Beynon was born in Dunvant, near Swansea, Wales on 24 May 1914, the youngest of four children. His father, a miner, held the responsible jobs of checkweightman and chief of the local mines rescue service. Beynon was educated at Gowerton Grammar School, before matriculating to the University of Swansea, where he studied physics.

In 1938 he gained a position at National Physical Laboratory at Slough, near London, working closely with Sir Edward Appleton. Together they performed basic studies of radio wave propagation by reflection from these layers. This cooperation persisted over a few decades, during which Beynon as representative of Sir Edward held senior offices in national and international committees, and took active part in the preparation and conduct of the International Geophysical Year 1957/8, which was a break-through in international cooperation in geophysics. He became thereafter one of the leading personalities in international scientific cooperation, in particular in the International Union of Radio Science (URSI). His perseverance saved the European Radar project EISCAT, by which progress was reached in understanding particular atmospheric phenomena at high latitudes.

In 1942 Beynon married Megan James. The couple had two sons and one daughter.

From 1946 Beynon carried out studies in physics at the University of Swansea.

In 1958 Beynon started teaching at the University of Aberystwyth, where he later became full professor and remained until 1991. For a long time he was chairman of the "Schools Council Committee for Wales". From 1972 to 1975 he was president of the International Union of Radio Science, and of EISCAT, of the "Year of the quiet Sun".

In 1973 he became a Fellow of the Royal Society, and was knighted in 1976.

He won the Chree medal and prize in 1983.

He died on 11 March 1996.

EISCAT has awarded 8 Sir Granville Beynon medals to distinguished persons since 2002.
