= Poker Flat Research Range =

American rocket range

Coordinates: 65°07′N 147°28′W

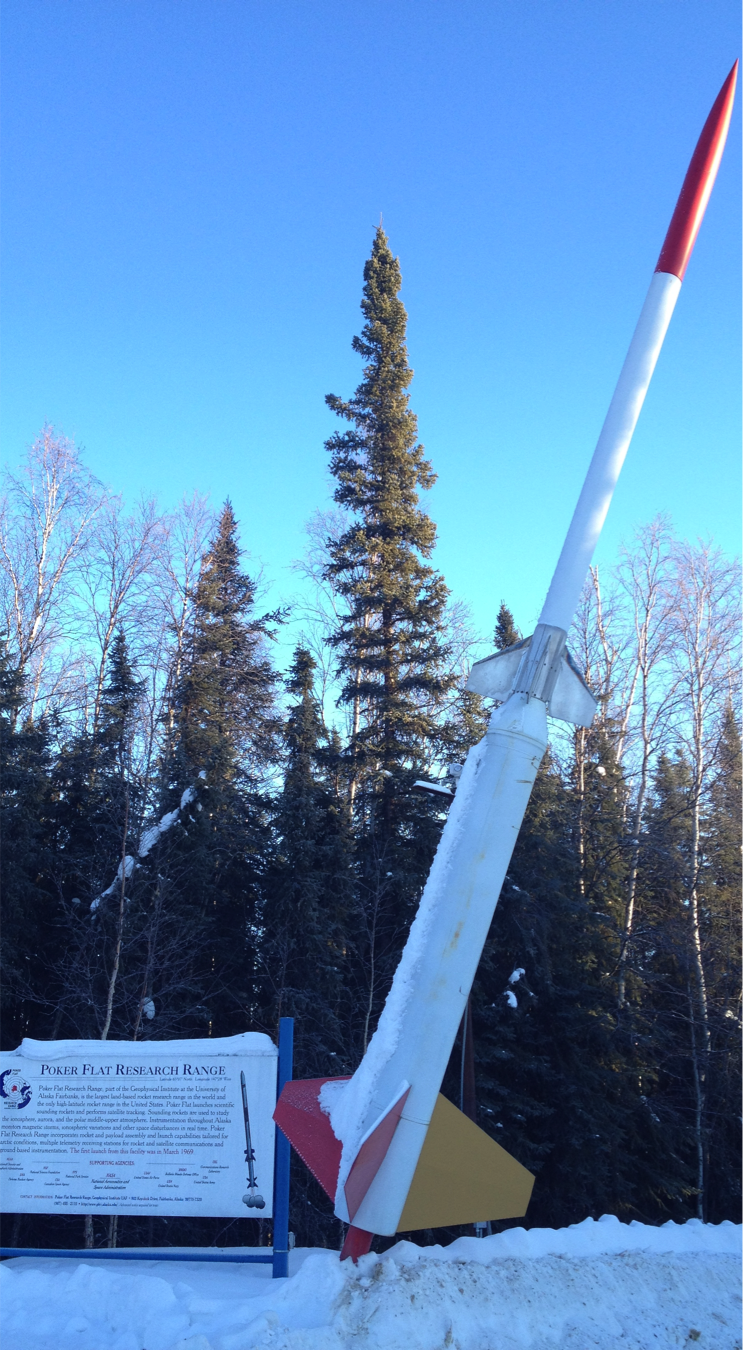
Entrance to Poker Flat Research Range

The Poker Flat Research Range (PFRR) is a launch facility and rocket range for sounding rockets in the U.S. state of Alaska, located on a 5,132-acre (20.77 km^{2}) site at Chatanika, about 30 miles (50 km) northeast of Fairbanks and 1.5 degrees south of the Arctic Circle. More than 1,700 launches have been conducted at the range to study the Earth's atmosphere and the interaction between the atmosphere and the space environment. Areas studied at PFRR include the aurora, plasma physics, the ozone layer, solar proton events, Earth's magnetic field, and ultraviolet radiation. Rockets launched at PFRR have attained an apogee of 930 miles (1,500 km).

PFRR is owned by the University of Alaska Fairbanks (UAF) Geophysical Institute, the only such owned by a university in the world, and is operated under contract to the NASA Wallops Flight Facility. Other users include the United States Naval Research Laboratory (NRL), the Air Force Geophysics Lab (AFGL), and various universities and research laboratories. Since its founding in 1969, PFRR has been closely aligned with and funded by the Defense Threat Reduction Agency and its predecessor, the Defense Nuclear Agency (DNA).

== History ==
The University of Alaska had performed auroral research since the 1920s, and when sounding rockets were developed for this purpose, the university decided to build a range for them. The UAF Geophysical Institute leased the land that became the PFRR from the state of Alaska, and the range's facilities were initially completed in 1969 with leadership and vision from T. Neil Davis. PFRR's first supervisor, Neal Brown, directed the facility for 18 years, from 1971 to 1989 (see www.nealbrownrockets.com). In the 1990s, new facilities were built with a $10 million grant provided by Congress. Refurbishment of older facilities is an ongoing project.

== Facilities ==
Poker Flat Research Range has four launch pads, including two optimized for severe weather, that can handle rockets weighing up to 35,000 pounds (16,000 kg). Range facilities include an administrative facility, a concrete blockhouse used as a mission control center, several rocket assembly buildings, a 2-story science observatory, and a payload assembly building. Three S-band antennas are used to collect telemetry, and a C-band radar is used for tracking rocket payloads in flight.

Poker Flat's activities are changing with the recent addition of SRI's PFISR (Poker Flat Incoherent Scatter Radar) phased-array antenna and the recent purchase of several Insitu drones.

The Alaska Ground Station (AGS) supports PFRR operations of many NASA and other nation's spacecraft including Aqua, Aura, Terra, and Landsat 7 with S band and X band services. The Honeywell Datalynx PF1 & PF2 antennas were hosted at the range, as part of the Earth Observing System Polar Ground Network (EPGN), along with the Alaska Ground Station (AGS). However, PF1 & PF2 were purchased by Universal Space Networks, now part of Swedish Space Corp SSC and later moved to SSC's North Pole facility and renamed USAK04 and USAK05. Other ground stations in the EPGN include the Svalbard Satellite Station (SGS), the Kongsberg–Lockheed Martin ground station (SKS), and the SvalSat ground station (SG3) in Norway, as well as the SSC North Pole facility.

== Sounding rockets ==
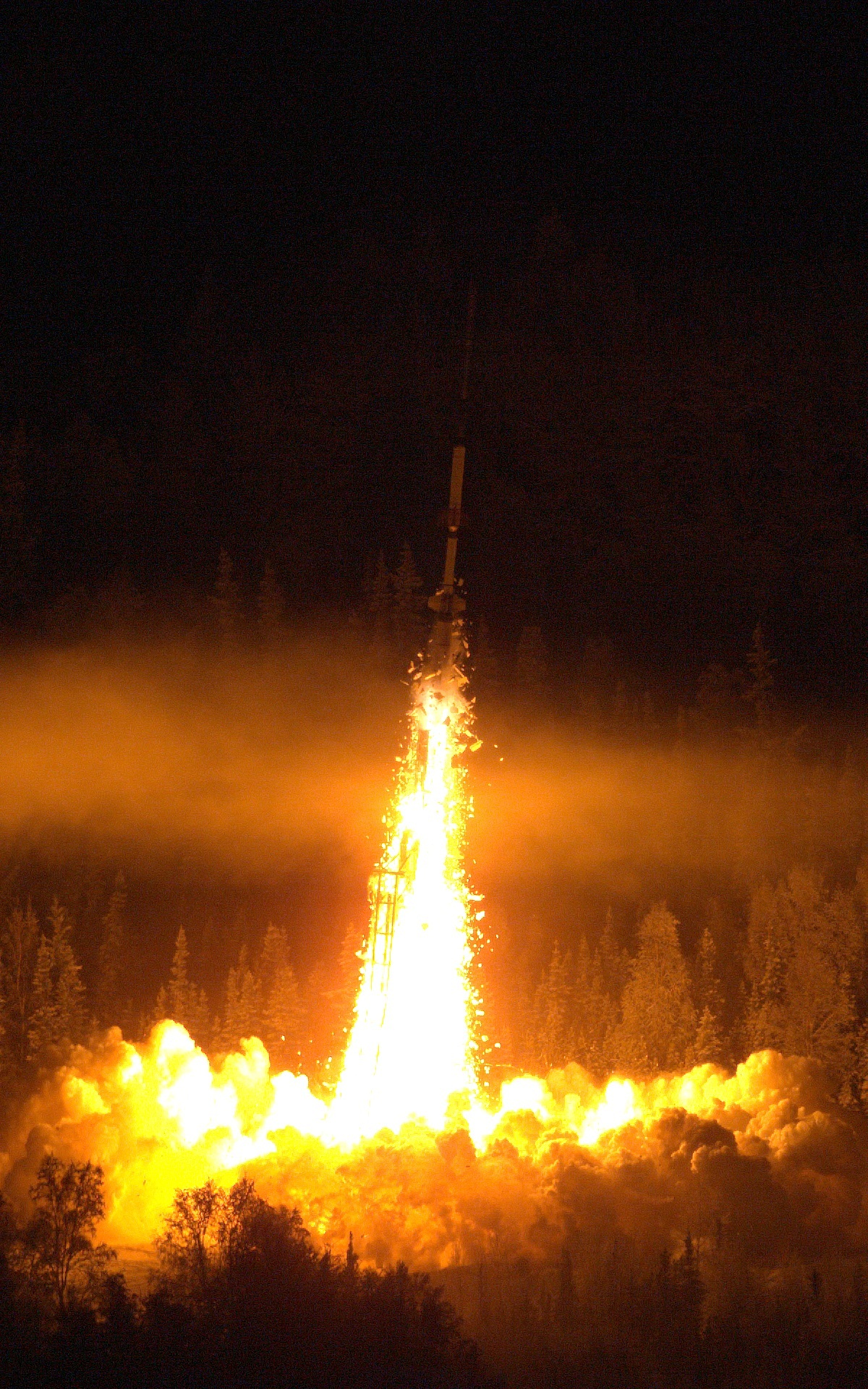
A NASA Talos Terrier Oriole Nihka (Oriole IV) sounding rocket leaves the launch pad at Poker Flat Research Range.

- Arcas
- Astrobee
- Black Brant
- MIM-23 Hawk
- MGR-1 Honest John
- Javelin
- Loki
- Nike
- Rocketsonde
- Sandhawk
- MGM-29 Sergeant
- Strypi
- RIM-2 Terrier
- TE-416 Tomahawk

== See also ==
- High Power Auroral Stimulation
- High-frequency Active Auroral Research Program (HAARP)
