= Fluxgate compass =

Compass that senses direction electronically

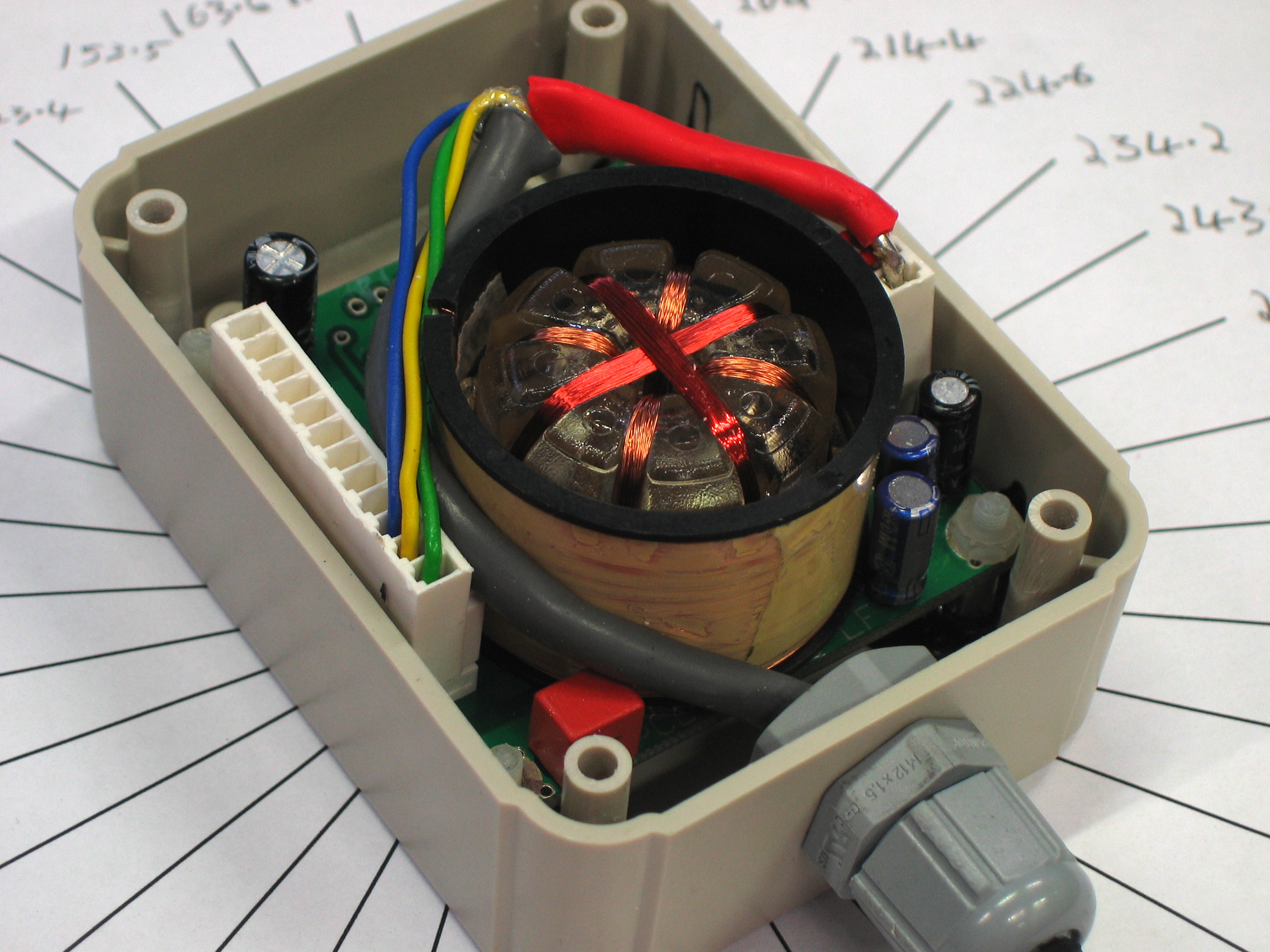
A fluxgate inclinometer/compass

The basic fluxgate compass is a simple electromagnetic device that employs two or more small coils of wire around a core of highly permeable magnetic material, to directly sense the direction of the horizontal component of the Earth's magnetic field. The advantages of this mechanism over a magnetic compass are that the reading is in electronic form and can be digitised and transmitted easily, displayed remotely, and used by an electronic autopilot for course correction.

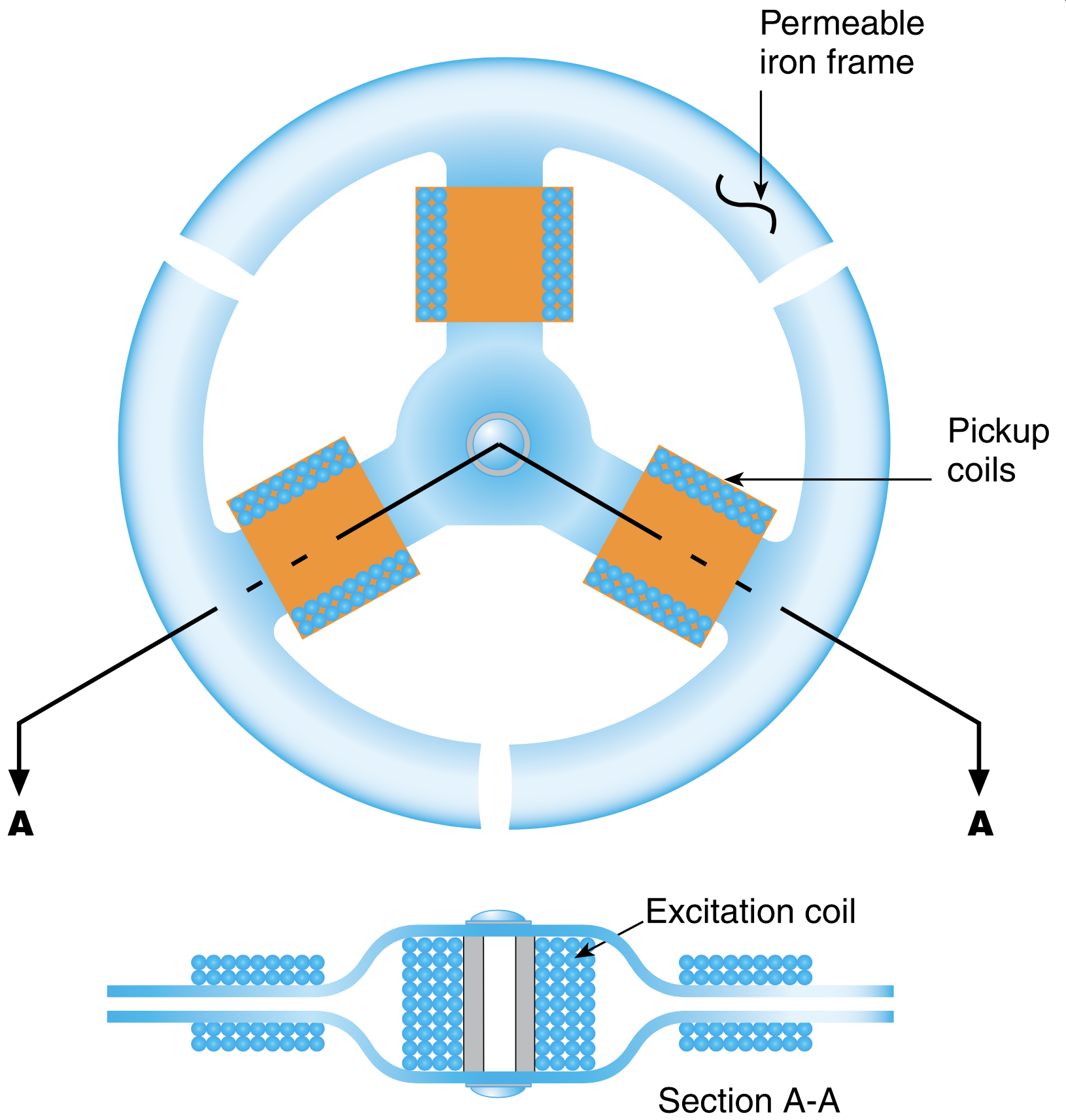
Flux valve of a type of fluxgate compass used on airplanes.

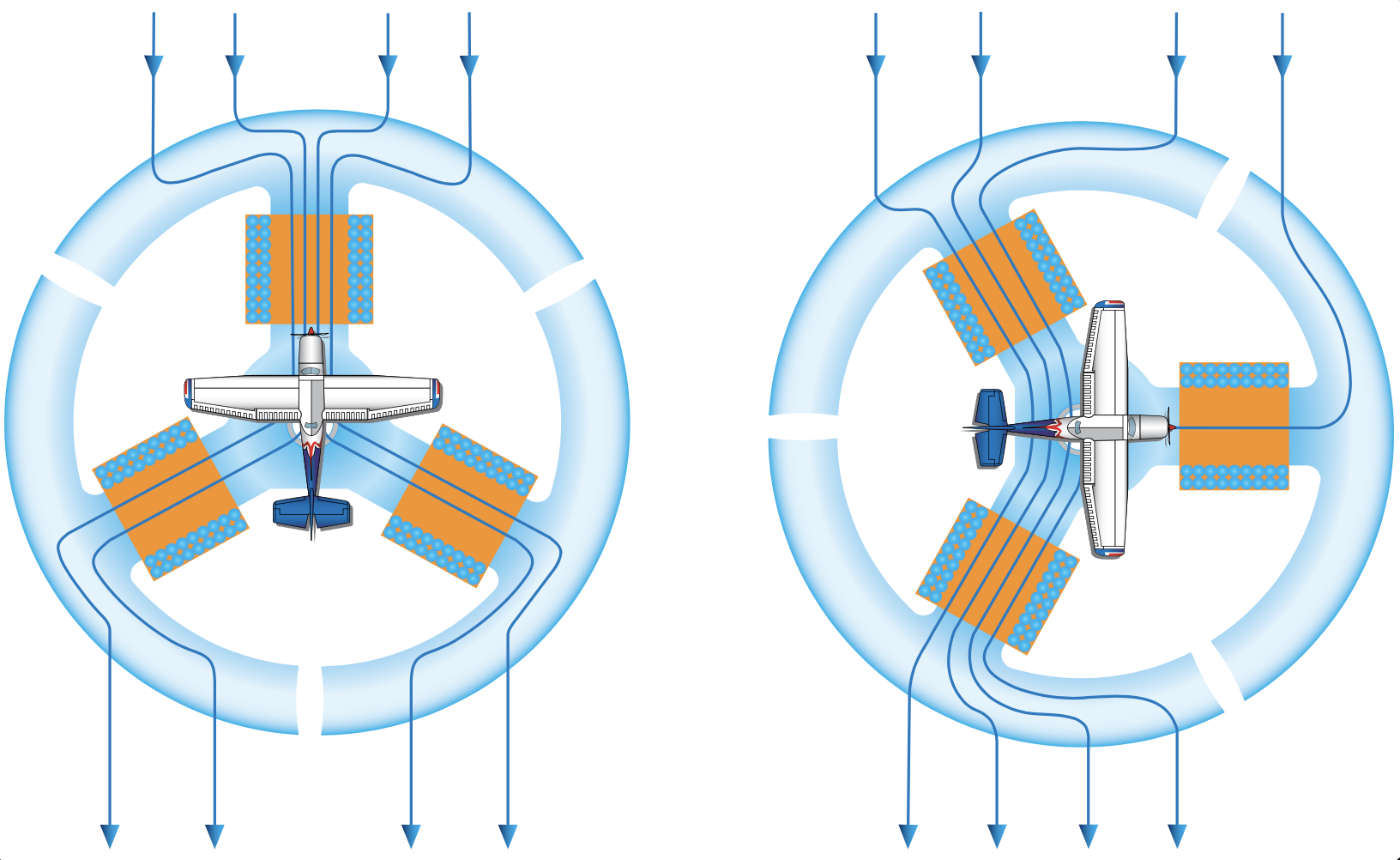
The current in each of the three pickup coils changes with the heading of the aircraft.

To avoid inaccuracies created by the vertical component of the field, the fluxgate array must be kept as flat as possible by mounting it on gimbals or using a fluid suspension system. All the same, inertial errors are inevitable when the vessel is turning sharply or being tossed about by rough seas. To ensure directional readings that are adequately stable, marine fluxgate compasses always incorporate either fluid or electronic damping. An alternative is to use a 3-axis fluxgate magnetometer to provide a 3D flux vector, with the magnetic heading derived from the flux on a plane perpendicular to gravity, thus providing immunity from pitching and rolling.

Fluxgate compasses and gyrocompasses complement one another nicely. The fluxgate provides a directional reference that is stable over the long term, apart from changing magnetic disturbances, and the gyrocompass is accurate over the short term, even against acceleration and heeling effects. At high latitudes, where the Earth's magnetic field dips downward toward the magnetic poles, the gyro data can be used to correct for roll-induced heading errors in the fluxgate output. It can also be used to correct for the roll- and heel-induced errors that often plague fluxgate compasses installed on steel vessels.

The fluxgate magnetometer was invented by German physicist Friedrich Förster in 1937, the fluxgate compass was invented by the Eclipse-Pioneer Division of Bendix in 1943.

== See also ==
- Fluxgate magnetometer for more details on the measurement method.
