= Course Correction =

Course Correction may refer to:

- In navigation, correction of the direction of travel
- "Course Correction" (Dexter: Resurrection), a 2025 television episode
- "Course Correction" (FlashForward), a 2010 television episode
- "Course Correction" (NCIS: New Orleans), a 2016 television episode
