= HIPAS Observatory =

Research facility in Alaska, US

- Alternative names: HIPAS
- Organization: University of Alaska Fairbanks
- Location: Fairbanks, Alaska, United States
- Coordinates: 64°52′19″N 146°50′31″W
- Altitude: 610 m (2,000 ft)
- Established: 1980s
- Closed: 2009

Telescopes
- High Power Auroral Stimulation: 1 MW RF transmitter (operating at 2.85 MHz)
- Location within Alaska
- Related media on Commons

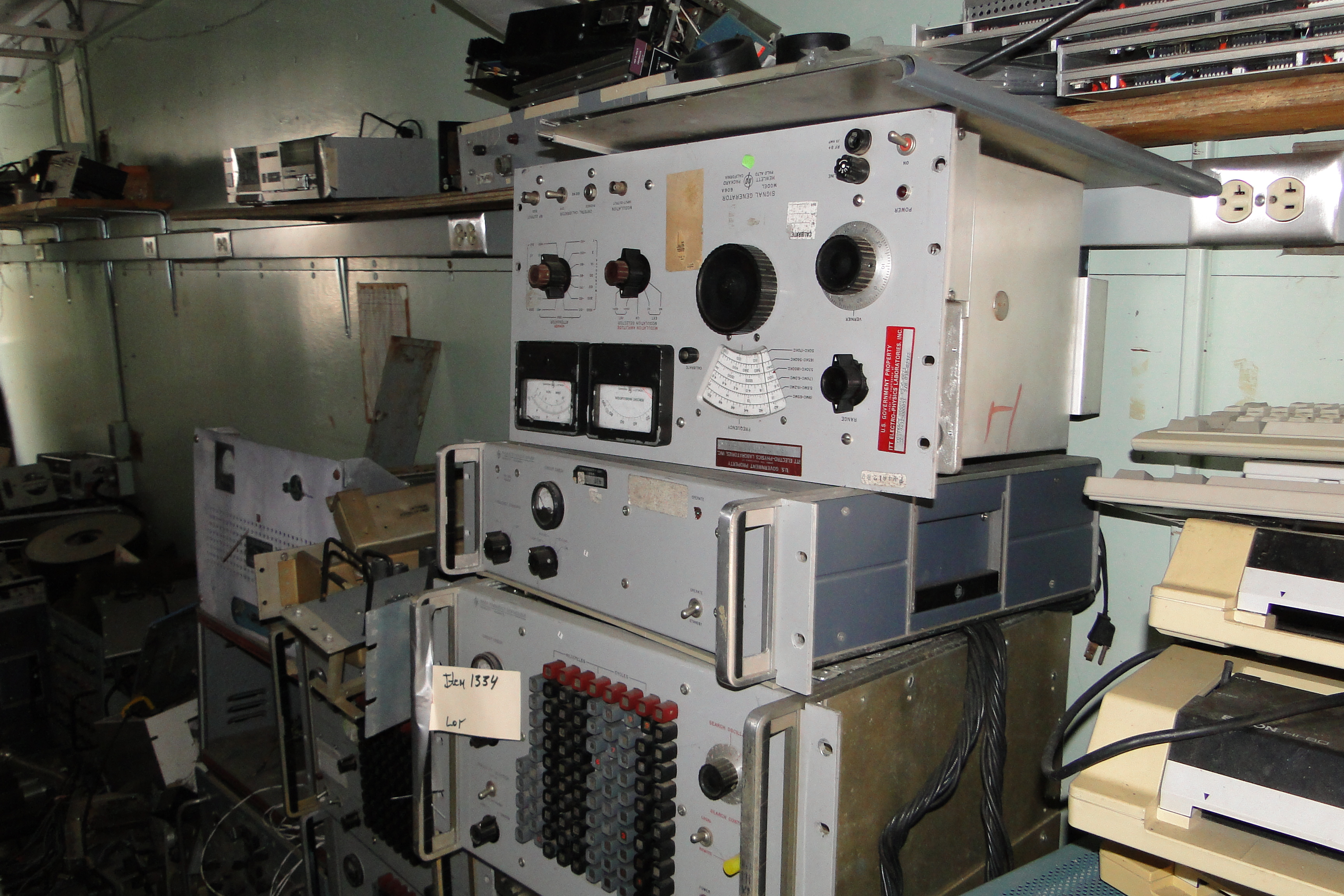
Electrical applications in the observatory shortly after closure

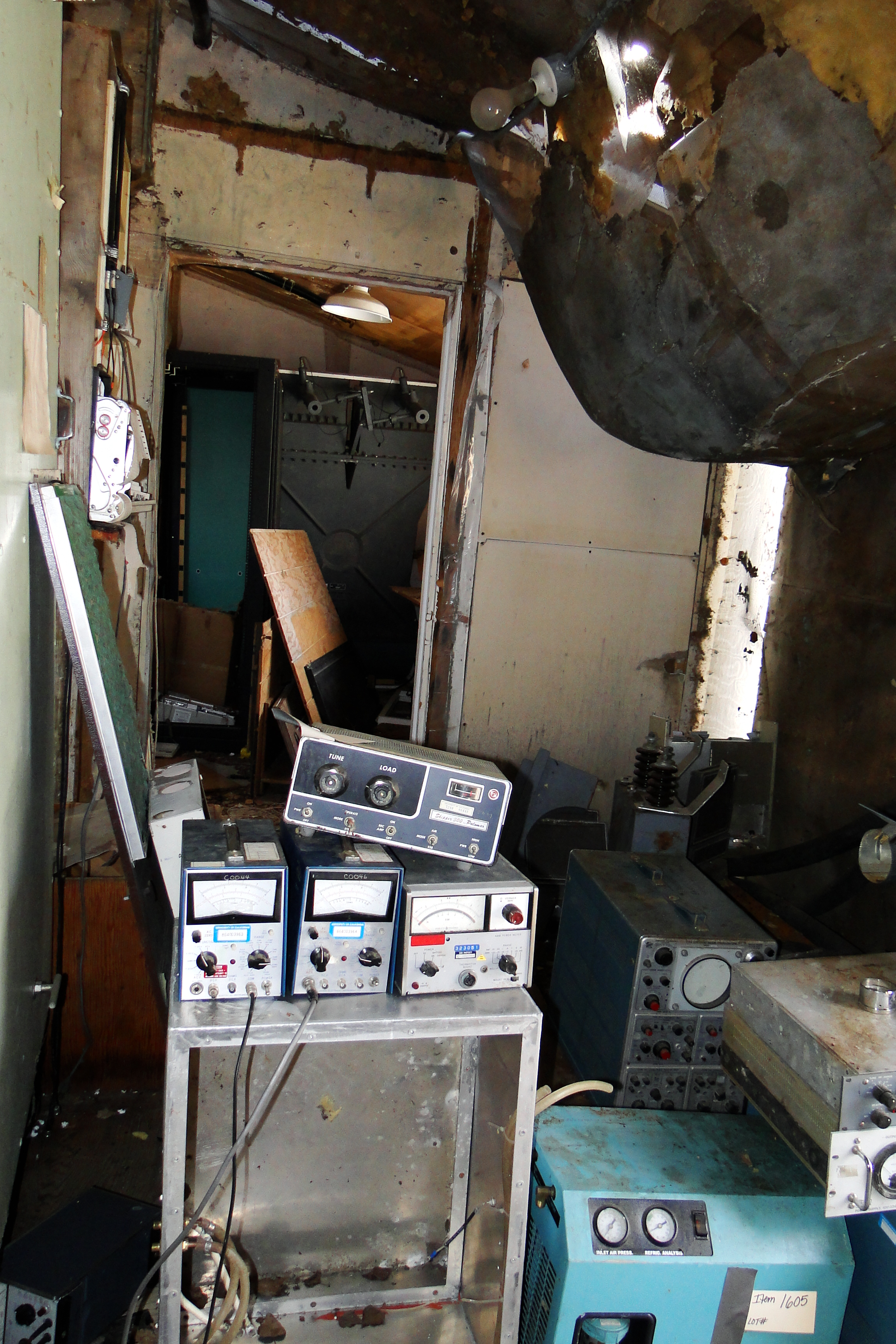
Interior, shortly after closure

The HIPAS (HIgh Power Auroral Stimulation) Observatory was a research facility, built to study the ionosphere and its influence on radio communications. It was located 25 miles east of Fairbanks, Alaska, in the Fairbanks North Star Borough area.

It was operated by the UCLA plasma physics laboratory from 1986 through 2007. A unique capability at that time, it could radiate 70 MW ERP at either 2.85 MHz or 4.53 MHz. These frequencies are close to a multiple of 2 and 3 of the electron gyro-frequency at ionospheric altitudes. Sending a pulse of HF-radio waves upward could accelerate the electrons in the ionosphere. Somewhat like waves on the ocean, the character of the ionosphere could be inferred from the backscatter signal. Other experiments attempted to combine RF and visible excitation where the latter probed metal ions such as sodium.

The HIPAS facility also used a LIDAR (LIght Detection and Ranging) instrument. Other projects included:

- A plasma torch used for experiments in hazardous waste disposal
- A 2.8-meter liquid-mirror telescope, which uses a spinning bowl of mercury to form the mirror, used for laser experiments
- An array of antennae used for exciting the ionosphere

The High Frequency Active Auroral Research Program (HAARP) is a similar facility funded jointly by the US Air Force and US Navy.

The HIPAS facility was shut down and much of the equipment sold as surplus in the spring of 2010.

== See also ==
- Other Alaskan astronomical research stations: HAARP, Poker Flat Research Range
- List of observatories
