= EISCAT =

Radar systems used to study the interaction between the Sun and the Earth

Coordinates: 69°35′10.67″N 19°13′28.62″E

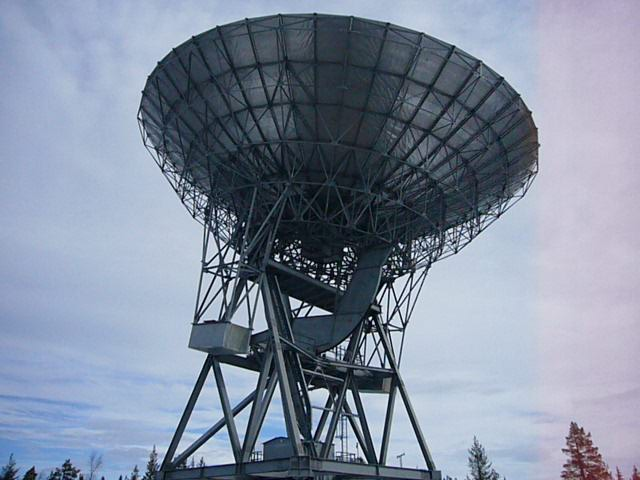
EISCAT Kiruna Radar (diameter 32m)

EISCAT (European Incoherent Scatter AB, formerly EISCAT Scientific Association) is a non-profit scientific research organisation that operates three incoherent scatter radar systems in Northern Scandinavia and Svalbard, as well as an ionospheric heating and short-wave radar facility.

The facilities are used to study the interaction between the Sun and the Earth as revealed by disturbances in the ionosphere and magnetosphere.

The EISCAT Scientific Association exists to provide scientists with access to incoherent scatter radar facilities of the highest technical standard.

== EISCAT 3D ==
The construction of EISCAT's new generation of incoherent radar sites, EISCAT 3D, started in November 2022.

The first stage of the new system will consist of three radar sites, functioning together, just as the old mainland system has. Transmitter upgrades and more sites will be added to the system in the future.

Instead of parabolic dishes, as used by the old system, EISCAT 3D is a multistatic radar composed of 5 phased-array antenna fields. Each field consists of small antennas working together as one – specifically, between 5,000 and 10,000 crossed dipole antenna mounted on top of a ground plane 70 meters in diameter. There is a core site (transmit + receive) and four receive-only sites.

The core site of EISCAT 3D is located just outside Skibotn, Norway. The facility will have 109 hexagonal antenna units as its main antenna, and 10 antenna units spread out around the main site. On top of the antenna units, the dipole antennas are mounted. The Skibotn facility will have 10 000 of these small antennas. The Skibotn facility will act both as a transceiver and receiver of the EISCAT 3D system.

Two receiver sites are located in Karesuvando, Finland and Kaiseniemi, Sweden. The facilities consist of 54 and 55 antenna units with approximately 5 000 dipole antennas. These sites were completed by September 2023. Two more sites are present according to the EISCAT UK website.

EISCAT 3D is intended to offer much more research data regarding the tracking of space debris and meteorites, GPS and radio traffic, auroras, climate, and near-Earth space.

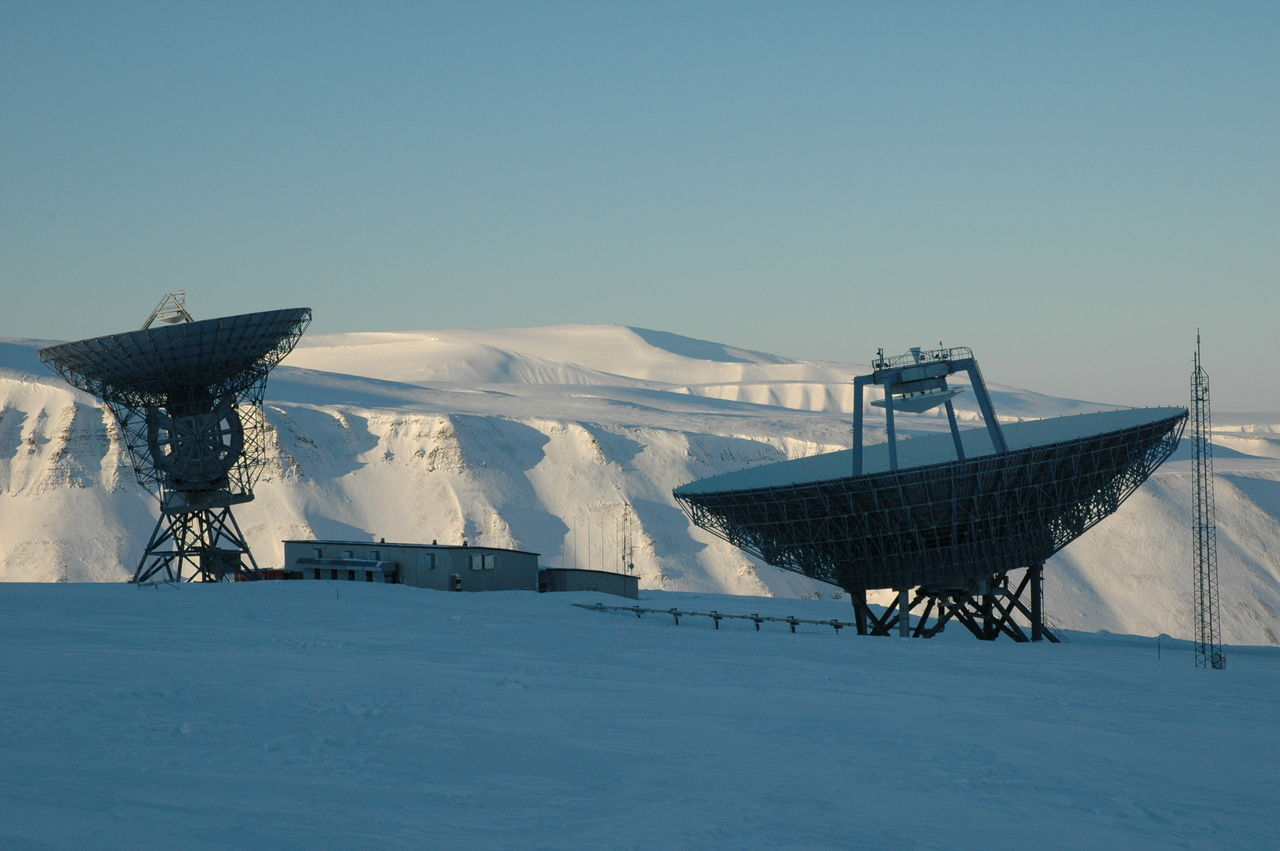
The two antennas of the EISCAT Svalbard Radar

== The mainland system ==
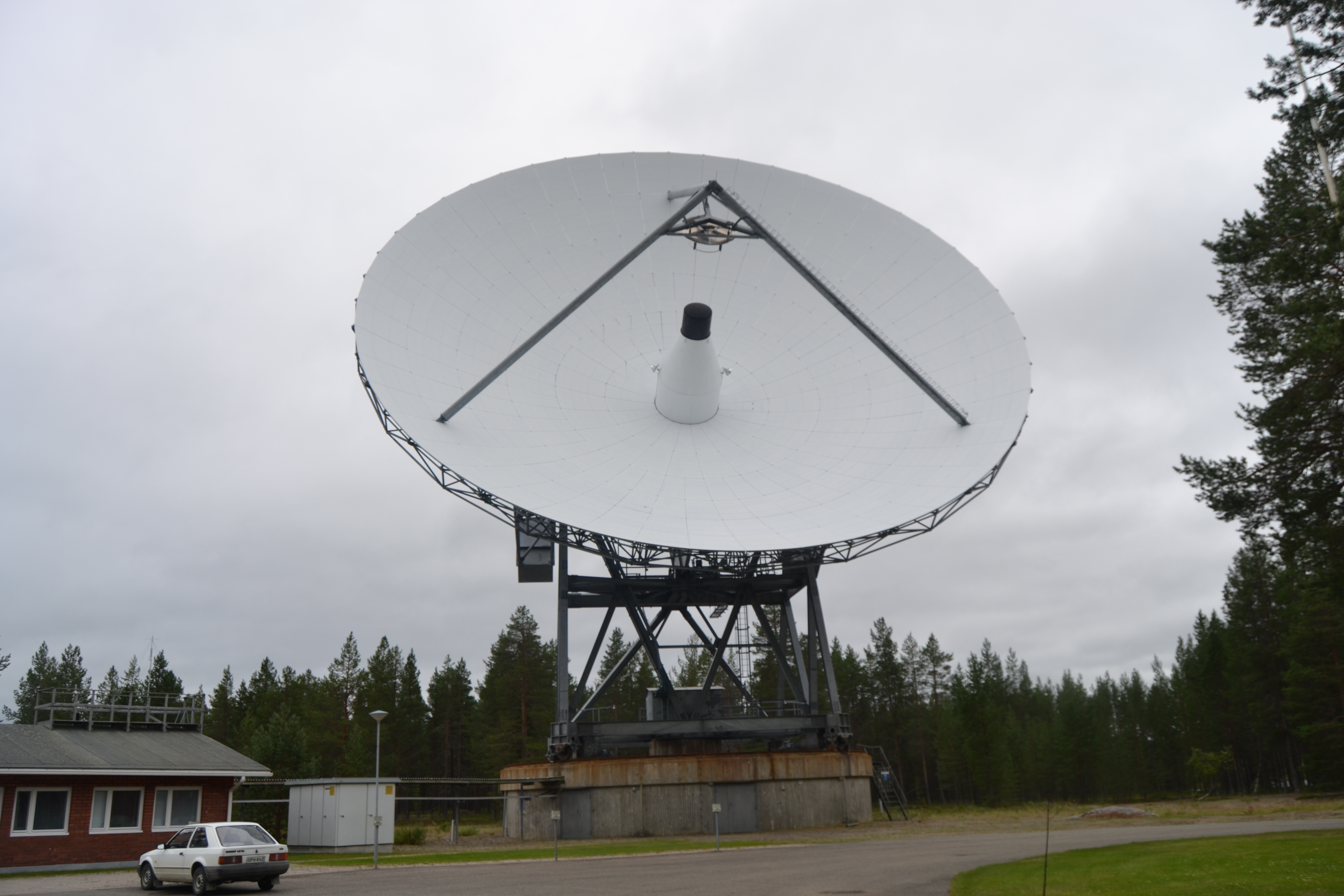
The former EISCAT Sodankylä receiver antenna (diameter 32m) after conversion to 224 MHz (crossed dipole replaced Cassegrain subreflector at focal point)

Inaugurated on 26 August 1981, the mainland system consisted of three parabolic dish research radar antennas, designed as a tristatic radar, that is, three facilities that work together. The radar antennas were erected in Tromsø, Norway; Sodankylä, Finland and Kiruna, Sweden, north of the Scandinavian Arctic Circle.

The core in the tri-static system, is located at Ramfjordmoen, outside Tromsø, Norway with a 32-meter mechanically fully steerable parabolic dish used for transmission and reception in the UHF-band. Operating in the 930 MHz band with a transmitter peak power 2.0 MW, 12.5% duty cycle and 1 μs – 10 ms pulse length with frequency and phase modulation capability.

And the VHF radar that operates in the 224 MHz band with transmitter peak power 3 MW, 12.5% duty cycle and 1 μs – 2 ms pulse length with frequency and phase modulation capability. The antenna, used for transmission and reception, is a parabolic cylinder antenna consisting of 4 quarters, constituting a total aperture of 120 m x 40 m. This antenna is mechanically steerable in the meridional plane (-30° to 60° zenith angle), and electronically steerable in the longitudinal direction (±12° off-boresight).

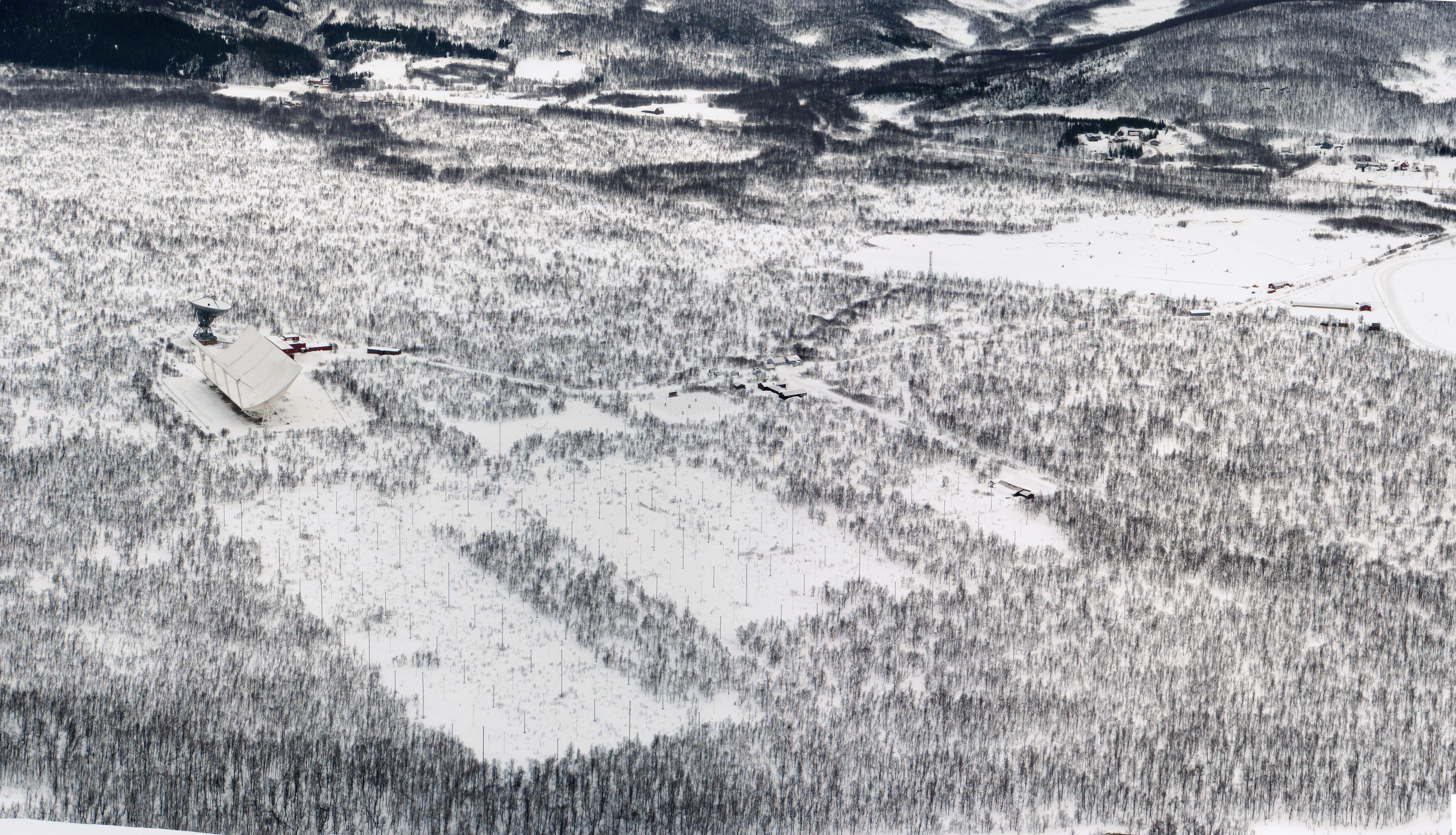
EISCAT Ramfjordmoen facility (near Tromsø) in winter

The receiving antennas in Sodankylä, Finland and Kiruna, Sweden, is fully steerable 32 meter parabolic dish antennas. The receivers include multiple channels for the UHF radar and the VHF radars. The data are pre-processed in signal processors, displayed and analysed in real-time and can be recorded to mass storage media.

The Kiruna antenna was demolished on 13 October 2024, and the Sodankylä antenna was demolished on 23 April 2025.

== EISCAT Svalbard Radar ==
The location in Longyearbyen, Svalbard, high above the Arctic Circle and near the North Pole, offers capabilities in auroral research. Svalbard's climate with polar night from November until February makes the season for observing the northern lights long.

The EISCAT Svalbard Radar (ESR) also operates the UHF-band, at 500 MHz with a transmitter peak power of 1000 kW, 25% duty cycle and 1 μs – 2 ms pulse length with frequency and phase modulation capability. There are two antennas, a 32-meter mechanically fully steerable parabolic dish antenna, and a 42-meter fixed parabolic antenna aligned along the direction of the local geomagnetic field.

The whole radar system is controlled by computers, and the sites in Tromsø, Kiruna, Sodankylä, and Longyearbyen are interconnected via the Internet.

== Tromsø Ionospheric Modification facility ==
An ionospheric heating facility, Heating, is also located in Ramfjordmoen outside Tromsø, Norway. It consists of 12 transmitters of 100 kW CW power, which can be modulated, and three antenna arrays covering the frequency range 3.85 MHz to 8 MHz.

== History ==
EISCAT was officially founded in December 1975, as an association of research councils in six member countries. Plans to establish a research facility focusing on incoherent scatter technology in the Northern Lights zone had started as early as 1969. Many meetings with interested researchers were held in the early 70s, but it was not until Professor Sir Granville Beynon organized a meeting in 1973, where a board and a chairman were appointed, that clear plans began to take shape. In 1974, the Council presented a report on how the organisation, operations and implementation of EISCAT's UHF system could take place, and at the end of 1975 the first six member states agreed to start the work towards the construction of EISCAT.

The member countries are now Sweden, Norway, Finland, Japan, China and the United Kingdom. The members have changed somewhat: Germany is no longer a full member, France was a member from the start of the organization in 1975 until 2005, while Japan and China were added later (1996 and 2007 respectively).

== Governance ==
EISCAT is governed by The EISCAT Council, which consists of representatives from research institutions in the various member countries. Two committees, the Administrative and Financial Committee (AFC) and the Advisory Scientific Committee (SAC), assist the Council in its work.
