= Sura Ionospheric Heating Facility =

Russian research centre

Coordinates: 56.1437°N 46.0991°E

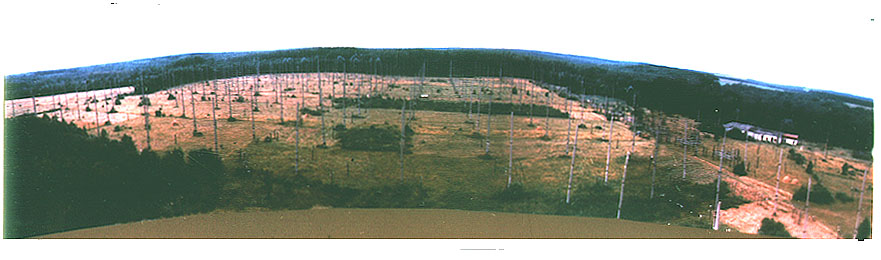
View of antenna array at Sura site

The Sura Ionospheric Heating Facility, located near the small town of Vasilsursk about 100 km (60 miles) eastward from Nizhniy Novgorod in Russia, is a laboratory for ionosphere research.

Sura is capable of radiating about 80 megawatts at 4.3 MHz, increasing to 260 megawatts at 9.5 MHz. The facility is operated by the radiophysical research institute NIRFI in Nizhny Novgorod. The Sura facility was commissioned in 1981. Using this facility, Russian researchers studied the behaviour of the ionosphere and the effect of generation of low-frequency emission on modulation of ionosphere current. In the beginning, the Soviet Defense Department mostly footed the bill.

== Technical information ==
The frequency range of the heating facility is from 4.5 to 9.3 MHz. The facility consists of three 250 kW broadcasting transmitters and a 144 crossed dipole antenna-array with dimensions of 300 metres x 300 metres (1000' x 1000'). At the middle of the operating frequency range (4.5 – 9.3 MHz) a maximum zenith gain of about 260 (~24 dB) is reached, the ERP of the facility is 190 MW (~83 dbW).
