= Platteville Atmospheric Observatory =

Coordinates: 40°10′54″N 104°43′30″W

The Platteville Atmospheric Observatory located near Platteville, Colorado was one of the first major ionospheric heaters in the world. Operating from 1968 through 1984, it expanded knowledge of ionospheric processes greatly. The observatory continues operation, but now focuses on wind profiling. The first studies were made of HF heater induced airglow, heater-induced spread F, wide band heater-induced absorption, and heater created field-aligned ionization.
