= Vasilsursk =

Vasilsursk Васильсурск Шурдӱҥ (Mari)
- Work settlement
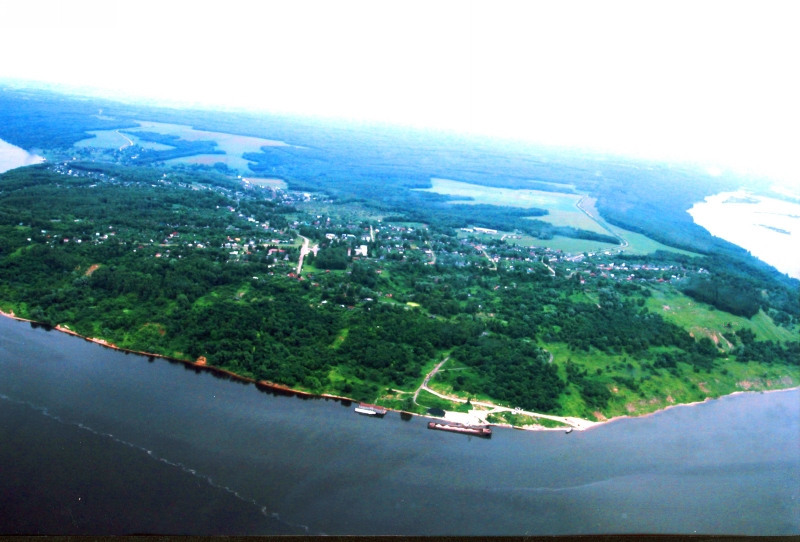
- Aerial view of Vasilsursk

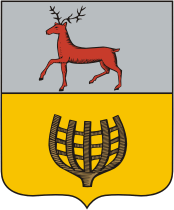
- Coat of arms
- Interactive map of Vasilsursk
- Location of Vasilsursk Vasilsursk (Nizhny Novgorod Oblast)
- Coordinates: 56°07′39″N 46°00′26″E
- Country: Russia
- Federal subject: Nizhny Novgorod Oblast
- Administrative district: Vorotynsky District
- Founded: 1523
- Elevation: 100 m (330 ft)

Population (2010 Census)
  - Total: 1,068
  - Estimate (2021): 676 (−36.7%)
- Time zone: UTC+3 (MSK)
- Postal code: 606263
- Dialing code: +7 8316432
- OKTMO ID: 22621154051
- Urban-type settlement Day: Second Sunday of August
- Website: www.vasilsursk.ru

Vasilsursk (Russian: Васильсу́рск) is an urban locality (a work settlement) in Vorotynsky District of Nizhny Novgorod Oblast, Russia, located on the Sura River, not far from its fall into the Volga.

== History ==
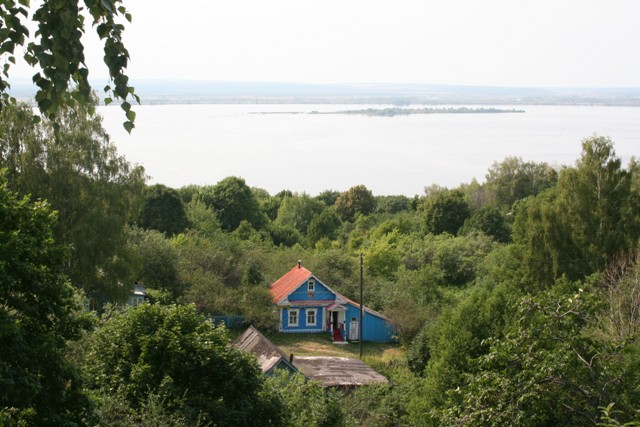
Vasilsursk in July 2010

A Kuruk Mari (a tribe of Mari people) wooden fortress named Tsepel used to stand where Vasilsursk is now located. Russians captured it after bloody fight in 1523 from Kuruk Maris and established on its site a small settlement. The fort here was used as an advanced base during the Russo-Kazan Wars.

== Climate ==
Vasilsursk has a humid continental climate (Köppen climate classification Dfb) with long cold winters and warm, often hot dry summers. The warmest month is July with daily mean temperature near +20 °C (68 °F), the coldest month is January −12 °C (10 °F).

== Population ==
Historical population
Year	1989	2002	2010
Pop.	1,871	1,329	1,068
±%	—	−29.0%	−19.6%
Source: 1,068 (2010 census); 1,329 (2002 census); 1,871 (1989 Soviet census).

== Transportation ==
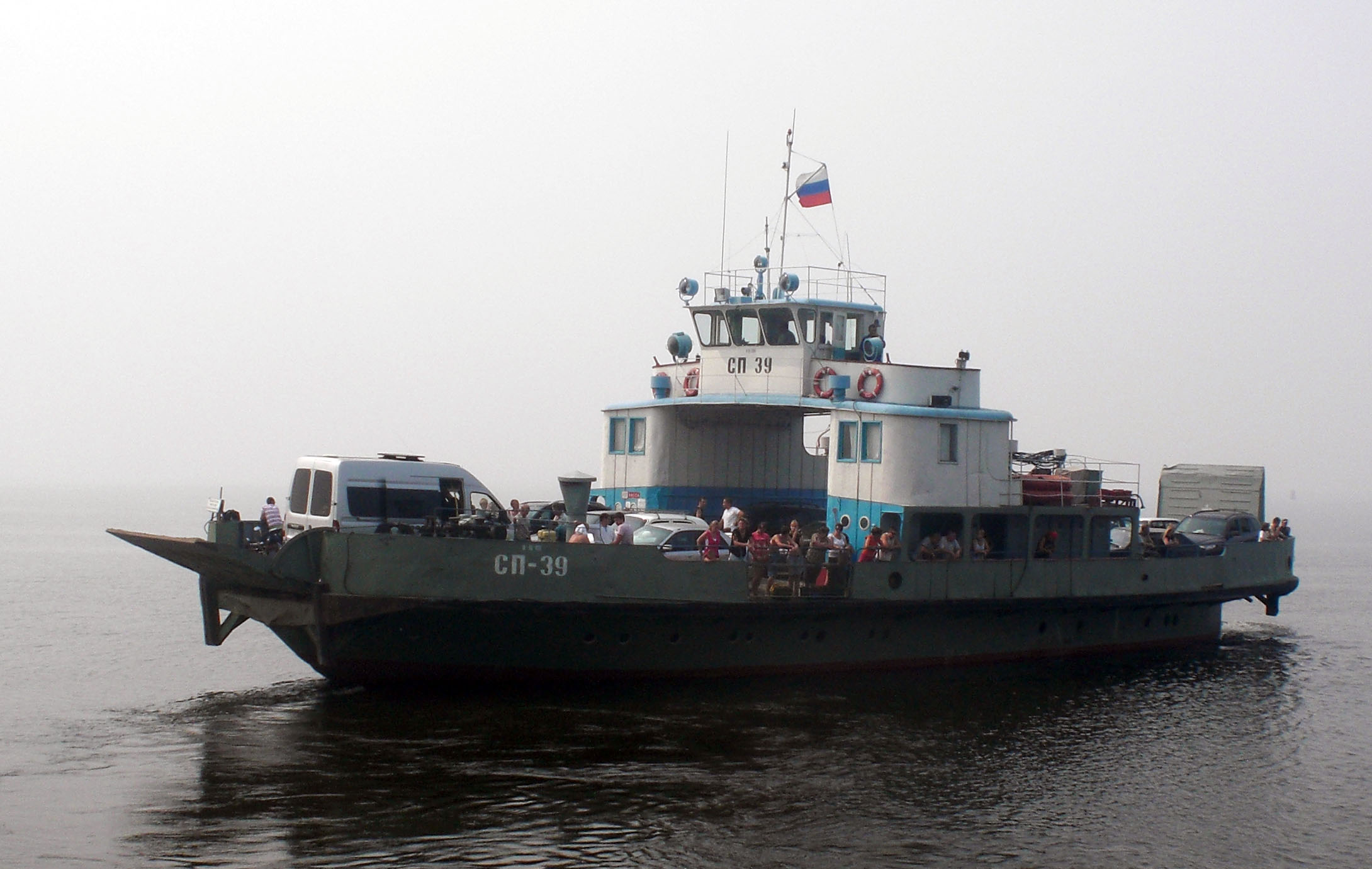
Ferries on Volga near Vasilsursk

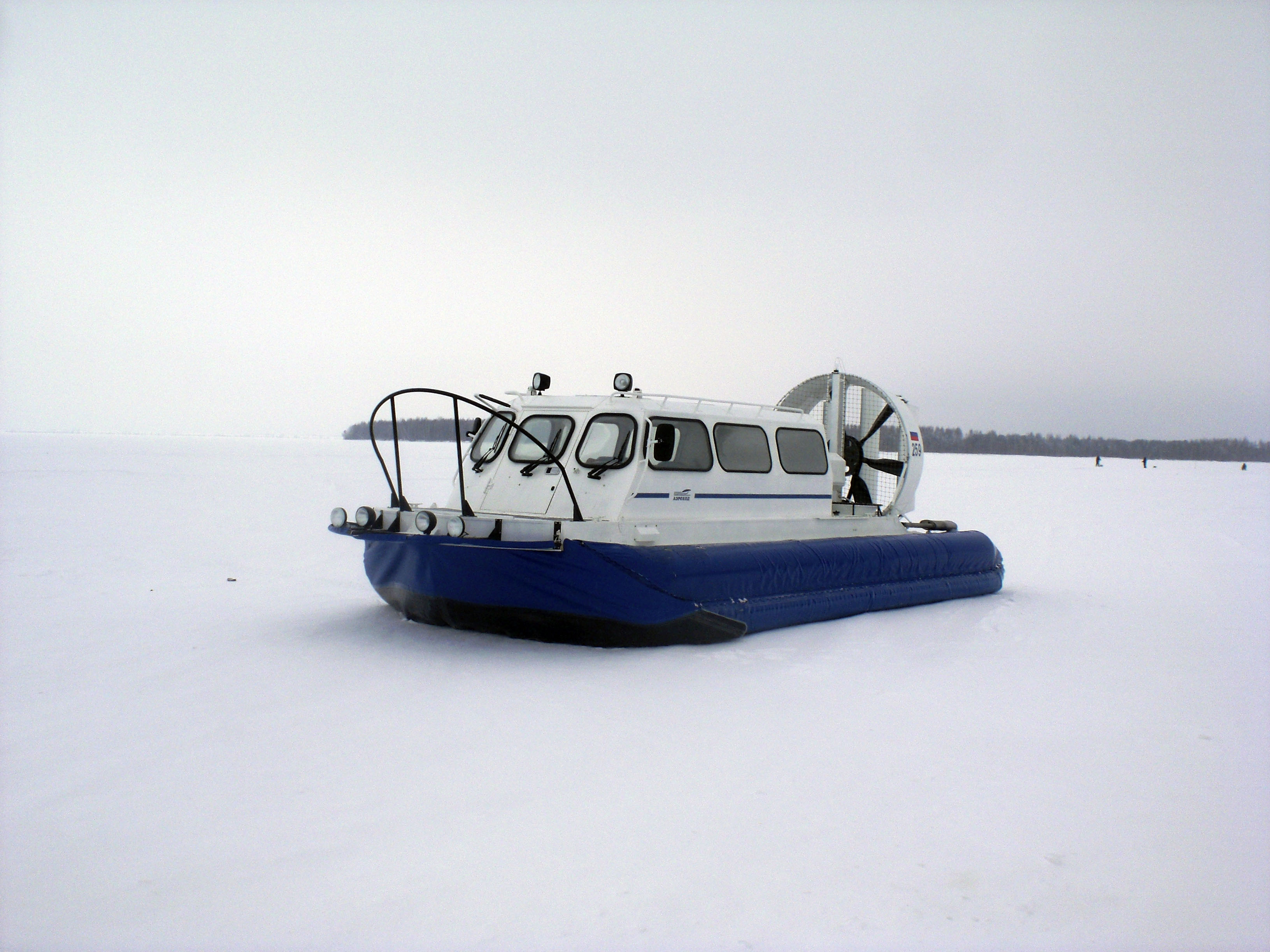
Amphibious boat "Khivus-10" near Vasilsursk

In warmer months, a ferry operates between Vasilsursk and the settlement of Lysaya Gora. During winter, passengers are transported by amphibious boats Khivus-10.

== Sura Ionospheric Heating Facility ==
The Sura Ionospheric Heating Facility, an ionospheric research facility, is located near Vasilsursk.
