= Mustapha Ishak-Boushaki =

Algerian theoretical physicist

- Born: Mustapha Ishak-Boushaki; January 25, 1967 (age 59); Algiers, Algeria
- Occupations: Professor and Researcher of Physics
- Title: Professor

Academic background
- Education: B.S., Computer Science University of Quebec at Montreal; B.S., Physics University of Montreal; Ph.D., Queen's University at Kingston; Research Associate, Princeton University
- Thesis: Studies in inhomogeneous cosmological models (2003)
- Doctoral advisor: Kayll William Lake

Academic work
- Discipline: Physics
- Sub-discipline: Astrophysics; Cosmology; General Relativity
- Institutions: University of Texas at Dallas; Princeton University; Queen's University at Kingston
- Website: https://personal.utdallas.edu/~mishak/

Mustapha Ishak-Boushaki is an Algerian-North American theoretical physicist, cosmologist and professor at the University of Texas at Dallas. He is known for his contributions to the studies of cosmic acceleration and dark energy, gravitational lensing, and testing alternatives to general relativity; as well as his authorship of Testing General Relativity in Cosmology, a review article published in Living Reviews in Relativity.

He was elected as a fellow of the American Association for the Advancement of Science (AAAS) in 2021 and as a fellow of the American Physical Society (APS) with the quote: "For distinguished contributions to the field of theoretical cosmology, particularly for testing modifications to general relativity at cosmological scales, and for sustained excellence in teaching and mentoring of students."

== Education and academic background ==
Mustapha Ishak-Boushaki was born in Algeria (North Africa), where he grew up and completed his pre-university studies in the city of Bouira. He moved to Montreal in 1987. In 1994, he received an undergraduate degree in computer science at the University of Quebec at Montreal, followed by an additional undergraduate degree in physics from the University of Montreal in 1998. He then attended Queen's University at Kingston where in 2003 he completed his PhD in general relativity and theoretical cosmology.

His graduate work included studies on inhomogeneous cosmologies, wormholes, exact solutions in general relativity of compact objects (such as neutron stars), and an inverse approach to the Einstein field equations.

Following the completion of his graduate studies, Ishak-Boushaki began work as a research associate at Princeton University until later entering a professorship at the University of Texas at Dallas in 2005. While at the University of Texas at Dallas, he formed an active group of cosmologists and astrophysicists, and received the Outstanding Teacher of the Year Award in the years 2007 and 2018, as well as the University President's Excellence in Teaching Award and the University of Texas System Regents Outstanding Teacher Award in 2022

He is an active member of the Dark Energy Science Collaboration and the Dark Energy Spectroscopic Instrument.

== Research and career ==
Mustapha Ishak-Boushaki's work involves research in the subjects of the origin and cause of cosmic acceleration and the dark energy associated with it, testing general relativity at cosmological scales, the application of gravitational lensing to cosmology, intrinsic alignment of galaxies, and Large-scale structure of the Universe.

In 2005, Ishak-Boushaki and collaborators proposed a procedure to distinguish between dark energy and modification to general relativity at cosmological scales as a cause of cosmic acceleration. The idea was based on the fact that cosmic acceleration affects both the expansion rate and the growth rate of large-scale structures in the universe. These two effects must be consistent one with another since they are based on the same underlying theory of gravity. The publication was one of the first to: (1) contrast dark energy versus modified gravity as cause of cosmic acceleration, (2) use inconsistencies between Lambda-CDM model cosmological parameters to test gravitational theory at cosmological scales.

He and collaborators wrote then a series of publications on testing general relativity at cosmological scales (see Bibliography), and his work on the subject was recognized by an invitation to write in 2018 a review article on the current state of research in the field of testing general relativity in the journal Living Reviews in Relativity. Ishak-Boushaki and collaborators made a first detection of the large-scale intrinsic alignment of galaxies of type "intrinsic shear – gravitational shear" using a spectroscopic galaxy sample from the Sloan Digital Sky Survey. He and collaborators also made a first detection of these intrinsic alignments using a self-calibration method in the photometric galaxy sample in Kilo-Degree Survey. Ishak-Boushaki and collaborator wrote a review article on the intrinsic alignment of galaxies and its impact on weak gravitational lensing.

Ishak-Boushaki and a collaborator proposed a new mathematical measure of inconsistency between cosmological datasets called the index of inconsistency (IOI) as well as a novel Bayesian interpretation of the level of significance of such measures.

== Awards and honors ==
- 2025 – Distinguished Chair in Natural Sciences and Mathematics, University of Texas at Dallas.
- 2024 – Piper Professor of Texas Award.
- 2023 - Provost's Award for Faculty Excellence in Graduate Research Mentoring at the University of Texas at Dallas.
- 2022 - University of Texas System Regents' Outstanding Teaching Award.
- 2022 – Fellow of the American Physical Society
- 2021 – Elected as Fellow of American Association for the Advancement of Science (AAAS).
- 2021 – Department of Energy Excellence Award for DESI (Dark Energy Spectroscopic Instrument) Collaboration.
- 2021 – President's Excellence in Teaching Award at University of Texas at Dallas.
- 2020 – Granted Builder Status Recognition for the Legacy Survey of Space and Time (LSST) – Dark Energy Science Collaboration (DESC) (26 recognized members over 1005 members in July 2020).
- 2018 – Award for Outstanding Teacher of the Year from the School of Natural Sciences and Mathematics. University of Texas at Dallas.
- 2013 – Robert S. Hyer Research Award from the Texas Section of the American Physics Society.
- 2007 – Award for Outstanding Teacher of the Year from the School of Natural Sciences and Mathematics, University of Texas at Dallas.
