= Christian David Ott =

German former theoretical astrophysicist

- Born: 27 September 1977 (age 49); Offenbach am Main, Germany
- Education: University of Heidelberg; University of Potsdam
- Awards: Potsdam Young Scientist Award (2007); Otto Hahn Medal of the Max Planck Society (2008); National Science Foundation Career Grant (2012); Sloan Fellow (2012-2014)
- Scientific career
- Fields: Theoretical astrophysics
- Doctoral advisor: Bernard F. Schutz

Christian David Ott (born 27 September 1977) is a German former theoretical astrophysicist.

== Career ==
Ott studied at the University of Heidelberg, where he received his diploma in theoretical astrophysics in 2003 under Wolfgang J. Duschl. He then moved to the University of Potsdam where in 2007 he earned an PhD summa cum laude working under Bernard F. Schutz. During his doctoral studies, he worked at the Max Planck Institute for Gravitational Physics in Golm. From 2006 to 2008, he was a postdoctoral researcher at the Joint Institute of Nuclear Astrophysics (JINA) at the University of Arizona with Adam Burrows, and from 2008 to 2009 he was a Sherman Fairchild Prize Fellow at Caltech.

Starting in 2009, Ott worked as an Assistant Professor at the Niels Bohr Institute. That same year, he also started working at Caltech as an Assistant Professor of Theoretical Astrophysics. Ott received a tenure-track position there and was a member of the Theoretical Astrophysics including Relativity (TAPIR) research group. From 2009 to 2014, he was also employed by the Louisiana State University as an Adjunct Assistant Professor.

=== Research focus ===
Ott dealt with the mechanisms of core-collapse supernovae, generation of gravitational waves and the resulting signatures from various sources, theory of long gamma-ray bursts (collapsar model), and general numerical relativity including scientific computing for massively parallel high-performance computers. He was part of the Simulating eXtreme Spacetimes (SXS) collaboration, contributed to the open-source Einstein Toolkit for numerical relativity, and was a member of the LIGO collaboration.

In 2006, he proposed a new mechanism for core-collapse supernovae in his dissertation (pulsation modes of the proto-neutron star and their damping through acoustic modes), which is also reflected in the signature of gravitational waves. In 2015, he demonstrated in magnetohydrodynamic simulations with others that strong magnetic fields, similar to those of magnetars, can develop in rapidly rotating massive stars (scenario of type Ic supernovae and the formation of long gamma-ray bursts).

=== Sexual harassment accusations and resignation ===
In late 2015 Ott was placed on unpaid leave from his position at Caltech after a university investigation found that he had violated the school's harassment policy after he was found to have harassed two of his female graduate students, He was originally suspended for 9 months. This was later extended by a year after he was found to have violated the terms of his suspension by contacting one of the complainants. It was also found that Ott violated the school's code of conduct by making up a female researcher who he listed as a co-author in a number of his papers.

The case received widespread media coverage and Ott went on to resign from his position at Caltech in 2017. Following his resignation, Ott signed a 2-year contract to work at Turku's Tuorla Observatory. His appointment triggered widespread protests in Finland, including an open letter signed by more than 240 academics, causing in the agreement's cancellation. Ott successfully sued for breach of contract and received $150 000 in damages from the observatory and the Stockholm University. He also unsuccessfully sued the two scientists from the University of Helsinki who originated the open letter for defamation.

Ott worked briefly as a visiting researcher at the Yukawa Institute for Theoretical Physics in Kyoto in 2017; since then, he has been working in the field of software engineering. He also contributed to the 2025 Lawrence Krauss book The War on Science.

== Awards ==
- Potsdam Young Scientist Award (2007)
- Otto Hahn Medal of the Max Planck Society (2008)
- National Science Foundation Career Grant (2012)
- Sloan Fellow (2012-2014)
