= Living Reviews (journal series) =

Open access journal series

Living Reviews is an open access journal series, which publishes regularly updated peer-reviewed review articles in various fields of science. Its concept of "living" articles takes advantage of web-based electronic publishing and allows authors to update their articles with the latest developments and research findings.

The concept of Living Reviews was developed by Bernard Schutz and Jennifer Wheary, who started the first journal, Living Reviews in Relativity, in 1998 at the Max Planck Institute for Gravitational Physics. The series now contains three entries

- Living Reviews in Relativity
- Living Reviews in Solar Physics
- Living Reviews in Computational Astrophysics

In June 2015, the series was sold to Springer International Publishing AG.

== See also ==
- Living Reviews in Landscape Research
- Cochrane Database of Systematic Reviews
- Open access in Germany
