= Living review =

In academic publishing, a "living" review is a review article that is updated at intervals to reflect the latest research. Living reviews are typically published online. Unlike in a print journal, readers are notified of newer versions. While each version must be cited separately, a living review acts as version control for the state of research.

For instance, the first article published in Living Reviews in Relativity was

- Rovelli, C. (26 January 1998). "Loop Quantum Gravity". Living Reviews in Relativity. 1 1. arXiv:gr-qc/9710008. Bibcode:1998LRR.....1....1R. doi:10.12942/lrr-1998-1. PMC 5567241. PMID 28937180.

In 2008, an updated version was produced:

- Rovelli, C. (15 July 2008). "Loop Quantum Gravity". Living Reviews in Relativity. 11 5. Bibcode:2008LRR....11....5R. doi:10.12942/lrr-2008-5. PMC 5256093. PMID 28179822.

The authors and titles of living reviews typically remain the same from version to version, although this is not required. The review title also typically remains the same, although developments may require title revisions to reflect the latest research, or an adjustment in the review scope.

Academic journals that publish living reviews include the Living Reviews astrophysics journal series, and the Cochrane Database of Systematic Reviews in medicine.

== See also ==
- Academic publishing
- Systematic review
