= Todd A. Thompson =

American theoretical astrophysicist

Todd Alan Thompson is an American theoretical astrophysicist. His research is mainly focused on the mechanism of core-collapse supernovae, the early evolution of neutron stars, heavy-element nucleosynthesis, the dynamics of few-body systems, and galaxy formation, including galactic winds, star formation feedback, and cosmic rays. Thompson is also a core member of the All Sky Automated Survey for SuperNovae (ASAS-SN).

== Early life and education ==
Thompson attended Lawrence University in Appleton, Wisconsin for his undergraduate education. He majored in physics and philosophy, and graduated in 1997. He then completed his graduate studies at the University of Arizona, working with Adam Burrows. Thompson earned his M.S. and his Ph.D. degree in physics, completing his dissertation on Topics in the Theory of Core-Collapse Supernovae.

== Career ==
After graduating from the University of Arizona, Thompson was a Hubble postdoctoral fellow at the University of California, Berkeley, and then a Lyman Spitzer Jr. Postdoctoral Fellow at Princeton University. He joined the Ohio State University’s Department of Astronomy as an assistant professor in 2007.

== Awards ==
Todd Thompson is the recipient of the Distinguished Scholar Award and the Alumni Award for Distinguished Teaching from The Ohio State University. He was also a 2009 Alfred P. Sloan Foundation Fellow and he is the inaugural holder of the Allan H. Markowitz endowed chair of Astronomy at the Ohio State University.

== Selected publications ==
- Kochanek, C. S., et al. 2017, “The All-Sky Automated Survey for Supernovae (ASAS-SN) Light Curve Server v1.0”, Publications of the Astronomical Society of the Pacific, 129, 104502
- Murray, N., Quataert, E., & Thompson, T. A. 2005, “On the Maximum Luminosity of Galaxies and Their Central Black Holes: Feedback from Momentum-driven Winds”, The Astrophysical Journal, 618, 569
- Thompson, T. A., Quataert, E., & Murray, N. 2005, “Radiation Pressure-supported Starburst Disks and Active Galactic Nucleus Fueling”, The Astrophysical Journal, 630, 167
- Metzger, B. D., et al. 2011, “The protomagnetar model for gamma-ray bursts”, Monthly Notices of the Royal Astronomical Society, 413, 2031
- Thompson, T. A., Chang, P., & Quataert, E. 2004, “Magnetar Spin-Down, Hyperenergetic Supernovae, and Gamma-Ray Bursts”, The Astrophysical Journal, 611, 380
