= Bernard F. Schutz =

American physicist

- Born: Bernard Frederick Schutz; 1946 (age 79–80); Paterson, NewJersey, US
- Education: California Institute of Technology
- Awards: Eddington Medal (2019)
- Scientific career
- Fields: Theoretical physics General relativity Gravitational waves
- Workplaces: California Institute of Technology; Yale University; Cardiff University; Max Planck Institute for Gravitational Physics
- Thesis: Relativistic Velocity: Potential Hydrodynamics and Stellar Stability (1972)
- Doctoral advisor: Kip Thorne
- Doctoral students: Miguel Alcubierre; Christian Ott
- Website: https://bfschutz.com/

Bernard Frederick Schutz FInstP FLSW (born August 11, 1946) is a British-American physicist. He is well known for his research in general relativity, especially for his contributions to the detection of gravitational waves, and for his textbooks.

Schutz is a Fellow of the Royal Society and a Member of the US National Academy of Sciences. He is a professor of physics and astronomy at Cardiff University, and was a founding director of the Max Planck Institute for Gravitational Physics (Albert Einstein Institute) in Potsdam, Germany, where he led the Astrophysical Relativity division from 1995 to 2014. Schutz was a founder and principal investigator of the GEO gravitational wave collaboration, which became part of the LIGO Scientific Collaboration (LSC). Schutz was also one of the initiators of the proposal for the space-borne gravitational wave detector LISA (Laser Interferometer Space Antenna), and he coordinated the European planning for its data analysis until the mission was adopted by ESA in 2016. Schutz conceived and in 1998 began publishing from the AEI the online open access (OA) review journal Living Reviews in Relativity, which for many years has been the highest-impact OA journal in the world, as measured by Clarivate. (The journal is now published by Springer.)

== Education and career activities ==
Bernard Frederick Schutz Jr. was born in Paterson, New Jersey in 1946.

Schutz attended Bethpage High School on Long Island, NY, from 1960–64, and went on to study physics at Clarkson University in Potsdam, NY (at that time named Clarkson College of Technology). He finished his degree in three years and went on to graduate study in physics at the California Institute of Technology in Pasadena, CA. The following year he joined the research group of Kip Thorne, finishing his PhD in 1971 on the theory of fluids in general relativity. A National Science Foundation Fellowship allowed him to spend the year 1971-72 in Cambridge, England, where he divided his time between the research group of Stephen Hawking and the Institute of Astronomy, led by Martin Rees. He then moved to a postdoctoral position at Yale University, in the group of James Bardeen, where he started a fruitful collaboration with fellow postdoc John Friedman.

In 1974, Schutz accepted a position as a Lecturer at Cardiff University in Wales (then called University College Cardiff), joining the newly established astronomy group in the Applied Mathematics department, chaired by Chandra Wickramasinghe. Schutz built up a large research group studying relativistic stars and dynamics. As an outgrowth of his teaching responsibilities, he wrote two well-received textbooks, Geometrical Methods of Mathematical Physics and A First Course in General Relativity (see Bibliography). Schutz became a full professor in 1986, around the time he began re-orienting his research toward gravitational wave detection.

During his time at Cardiff, Schutz organised an irregular series of meetings, the Gregynog Relativity Workshops, held at the Gregynog conference centre in mid-Wales. These meetings became a popular way for specialists in relativity in the UK and worldwide to have informal discussions focussed on key research problems. In 1986 and 1987, Schutz organised two international meetings in Cardiff that were aimed at improving coordination and data sharing among gravitational wave detector projects. The second one was sponsored by NATO, and he edited its published proceedings, Gravitational Wave Data Analysis. Schutz served on a number of advisory committees to the UK research councils, and eventually became the first chair of the Astronomy Committee of the newly established Particle Physics and Astronomy Research Council (PPARC), 1994-95.

In 1995 Schutz moved to Germany to join Jürgen Ehlers in founding the Max Planck Institute for Gravitational Physics, commonly known as the Albert Einstein Institute (AEI). This was established in Potsdam, Germany, by the Max Planck Society (MPS) as part of its effort to expand scientific research into areas of former East Germany, following German reunification in 1990. Ehlers led work in mathematical general relativity and Schutz focussed on astrophysical relativity, including numerical simulations of black holes and theoretical studies supporting gravitational wave detectors. With generous funding from MPS, the institute quickly expanded, adding a third Director (Hermann Nicolai, for quantum gravity) in 1997. After Ehlers retired at the end of 1998, Schutz became Managing Director and supervised the establishment a second branch of the AEI in Hannover in 2002. This branch, led by Karsten Danzmann, managed the GEO600 gravitational wave detector and quickly became a major centre for experimental gravitational wave physics, developing key technologies for both the ground-based detectors like GEO600 and LIGO and for the space-based LISA-Pathfinder technology demonstrator mission, the LISA (Laser Interferometer Space Antenna) gravitational wave detector mission, and the space-geodesy mission GRACE Follow-On. Bruce Allen joined the Hannover branch in 2007 as the Director of the new division of Observational Relativity and Cosmology.

After 1995, Schutz served on several committees of the European Space Agency, including chairing its Fundamental Physics Advisory Group from 2004-2008. He served on the LSC's Executive Committee from 2003 until 2019.

Schutz is well-known for his advocacy of open-access scientific publishing. At the AEI, Schutz founded and in 1998 began publishing the open-access online-only review journal Living Reviews in Relativity. It was unique in that its review articles were updated periodically by their authors. This feature proved attractive to readers, and (based on citation counts per article) the journal has for many years had the highest impact factor of any open-access journal worldwide. Its sister journal, Living Reviews in Solar Physics, which began publishing in 2004 from the Max Plank Institute for Solar Physics, is also very highly cited, consistently in the top 100 worldwide. A third journal, Living Reviews in Computational Astrophysics, began publishing in 2015. All three journals are now published by Springer. Schutz was a member of the editorial board of the first OA journal published by the APS, Physical Review X, from its inception in 2011 until 2018. He is currently a member of the editorial board of the Proceedings of the National Academy of Sciences.

The Living Reviews concept was one of the inspirations for the 2003 Berlin Declaration on Open Access, and Schutz helped organize many of the continuing series of Berlin OA Conferences at venues around the world. He hosted the 4th at the AEI. For his contributions to expanding OA, he received the Communitas Award from the Max Planck Society in 2013.

Schutz has long had a strong interest in scientific outreach and education. His book Gravity from the Ground Up provides advanced high-school students and university students with an intuitive introduction to modern gravity using only algebra, thereby avoiding the daunting mathematics of general relativity. Together with Milde Science Communications, Schutz developed the Scienceface website, which offers original interviews and short videos of scientists working on black holes and gravitational waves. Again with help of Milde Science Communications and also Exozet Potsdam, Schutz developed a multimedia popular lecture on gravitational waves called Music of the Spheres, which he presented in many locations around the world, leading up to the first detection in 2015.

In 2014 Schutz retired from the AEI and became an Emeritus Director, and he returned to Cardiff University for a part-time professorship. His first activity there was to help set up and then to become the first director of the Data Innovation Research Institute, which assists research groups in the university who are dealing with issues of big data. After stepping down from this, Schutz returned to research and teaching in general relativity and gravitational waves at Cardiff. In 2015 he became an adjunct professor of physics at the Georgia Institute of Technology.

== Research ==
In his PhD thesis in 1971, Schutz reformulated the relativistic equations of fluid dynamics in terms of scalar velocity potentials,[1] an approach that has since had many applications in field theory and cosmology. He used this reformulation in his thesis to develop a framework for studying the pulsation and stability of stars in general relativity.

This early work led, in collaboration with John Friedman during the 1970s, to the elucidation of the unexpected gravitational-wave driven instability of rotating stars, first noticed by Chandrasekhar in the simple model of uniform-density stars. In what is now called the Chandrasekhar-Friedman-Schutz (CFS) instability, gravitational wave emission taps into the rotational energy of the star in such a way that a small initial perturbation will grow exponentially fast unless it is sufficiently strongly damped by some other effect, like viscosity. It is a generic instability, potentially present in all rotating stars. A member of the CFS class is the r-mode instability discovered by Nils Andersson, which is thought to limit the rotation rate of neutron stars.

Working with Toshifume Futamase, Schutz developed a new way of approaching what is called the post-Newtonian limit of general relativity, in which general relativity makes small corrections to Newtonian gravity. The Futamase-Schutz method is free of the point-mass singularities used in most other approaches to this problem, and it is based on initial data, so it is mathematically fully consistent and convergent. They then used it to prove rigorously that the standard "quadrupole formula" for the emission of gravitational waves applies even if the sources are orbiting black holes, which are of course not small corrections to Newtonian objects.

In 1986, now focussing more on gravitational wave detection, Schutz showed that the gravitational waves emitted by a binary system contain information from which it is possible to deduce the distance to the source, something that is normally very difficult to do in astronomy. This possibility arises from the special scale-free nature of gravity in general relativity. Because the distance information is encoded in the phase evolution of the emitted waves and in their polarization, a network of at least three interferometric gravitational wave detectors is necessary in order to extract this information from the data. These systems were christened "standard sirens" by Daniel Holz and Scott Hughes. Knowing the distance to the source is important for extracting almost all the physical information that comes from gravitational wave observations of merging binary systems: the masses and spins of the component objects, statistical measures of the rate of such events per unit spatial volume, and estimates of how the formation rate of such systems has evolved over time since the Big Bang.

Besides showing how to measure distances, in his 1986 paper Schutz showed how a number of detections of such binaries could be used to measure the value of the Hubble Constant H0, which represents the expansion rate of the Universe. He showed how this would be possible even if the emitting binary systems could not be individually identified though optical or other astronomical observations. Because of the importance of H0 and because of the difficulty of measuring it accurately with other astronomical methods, this became a principal part of the scientific case for building LIGO and other detectors, which were being proposed in the late 1980s. The first gravitational-wave measurement of H0 was eventually performed in 2017 with the data from GW170817, the first detected merger of two neutron stars. As future observations by LIGO, Virgo, and KAGRA accumulate more and more statistics, this method is expected in the long run to provide the most accurate way of measuring H0.

Schutz oriented most of the effort of his research group in Cardiff after 1986 to the development of methods of data analysis, not just to detect binary system mergers, but also to search for spinning neutron stars, for a random cosmological background of gravitational waves, and for unexpected signals. In 1990 his group began the analysis of data from the "100-Hour Run", which was the first extended joint data-taking exercise between two interferometers, the prototypes in Glasgow and in Garching, Germany. This data run and analysis had been requested by the funding providers of both the UK and Germany, as part of their evaluation of the joint UK-German proposal for a 3-km gravitational wave interferometer to be built in Germany. Although the proposal was not funded (in part because German reunification in 1990 forced a redirection of government funding away from pure science and into the rebuilding of the former East Germany), Schutz's group did the data analysis and set upper limits on possible signals. The exercise allowed the group to create the first working versions of algorithms that still lie at the heart of the LIGO-Virgo-KAGRA data analysis today.

Also in the late 1980s, Schutz began working with Chris Clarke and John Stewart to develop methods to program supercomputers to solve Einstein's equations, with the aim of studying the mergers of binary black holes. His PhD student Gabrielle Allen and postdoc Miguel Alcubierre have gone on to establish themselves as leading experts in this field.

In the 1990s, Kostas Kokkotas and Schutz discovered a new family of neutron-star vibration modes that do not exist in Newtonian gravity, in which the relativistic gravitational field around the star is the principal dynamical element. Dubbed w-modes, these are stellar analogues of the quasi-normal vibration modes of black holes.

When he moved to the AEI in 1995, Schutz was able to build a bigger group in numerical relativity, bringing Ed Seidel from NCSA in the US to lead it. Supplied with leading-edge in-house computing systems, this group was for many years the largest in the world devoted to numerical relativity, and made fundamental contributions that underlie much of the current software in this field. In particular the open Einstein Toolkit has roots in software created at the AEI in this period. Schutz himself focussed more on preparing for gravitational wave data analysis. He helped develop the F-Statistic, which is the optimal frequentist statistical measure of the significance of a possible detection of a nearly periodic signal from a spinning neutron star. Working with M.-A. Papa and other collaborators, Schutz helped develop the Hough Transform technique for efficient hierarchical searches for such signals in months-long stretches of data, a method that is still a key tool for LIGO-Virgo-KAGRA analysis.

== Honors and awards ==
Schutz received the 2019 Eddington Medal of the Royal Astronomical Society (RAS) and the 2006 Amaldi Gold Medal from the Italian Society for Gravitation (SIGRAV), shared the 2020 Richard A. Isaacson Award of the American Physical Society (APS), and was awarded an honorary DSc by the University of Glasgow in 2011. In 2011, he was also elected a Fellow of the Learned Society of Wales.

=== List ===
Academies:

- Fellow, Royal Society of London (elected 2021)
- Member, National Academy of Sciences, USA (elected 2019)
- Fellow, Learned Society of Wales (elected 2011)
- Member, Deutsche Akademie der Naturforscher Leopoldina (elected 2006)
- Member, Royal Academy of Arts and Sciences, Uppsala, Sweden (elected 2005)

Medals and other awards from societies:

- Richard A. Isaacson Award in Gravitational-Wave Science, American Physical Society, jointly with Bruce Allen (2020)
- Eddington Medal of the Royal Astronomical Society (2019)
- Honorary DSc, University of Glasgow (2011)
- Amaldi Gold Medal of the Italian Society for General Relativity and Gravitation (SIGRAV) (2006)
- Communitas Award, Max Planck Society (2013)
- Fellow, International Society on General Relativity and Gravitation (2013)
- Honorary Fellow, Royal Astronomical Society (2009)
- Fellow, American Physical Society (1998)

Awards jointly with other members of the gravitational wave detector collaboration:

- Breakthrough Prize in Fundamental Physics (2016)
- Gruber Cosmology Prize (2016)
- Bruno Rossi Prize (2017)
- Royal Astronomical Society Group Achievement Award (2017)
- Princess of Asturias Prize for Technical and Scientific Research (2017)
- Einstein Medal (2017)

== Bibliography ==
- Schutz, Bernard F. (1980), Geometrical methods of mathematical physics, Cambridge University Press, ISBN 0-521-29887-3
- Schutz, Bernard F. (1985), A first course in general relativity, Cambridge University Press, ISBN 0-521-27703-5
- Schutz, B.F. (1989), Gravitational Wave Data Analysis. In: NATO ASI Series C: Mathematical and Physical Sciences, Vol. 253., Kluwer, ISBN 978-94-010-7028-7
- Schutz, Bernard F. (2003), Gravity from the ground up, Cambridge University Press, ISBN 0-521-45506-5
- Schutz, Bernard F. (May 31, 2009), A first course in general relativity (2 ed.), Cambridge University Press, ISBN 978-0-521-88705-2

== See also ==
- Chandrasekhar–Friedman–Schutz instability
