= Sami Solanki =

Astronomer

Sami K. Solanki
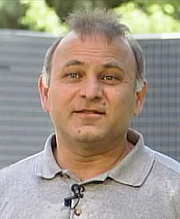
- Born: 2 October 1958 (age 67); Karachi, Pakistan
- Known for: Solar and heliospheric physics, Solar magnetism, Sun-Earth relations and physics of the solar atmosphere
- Scientific career
- Fields: Astronomy, Solar physics
- Workplaces: Max Planck Institute for Solar System Research

Notes
- Personal Homepage, ADS List of Publications, List of publications (ADS)

Sami Khan Solanki (born 1958 in Karachi, Pakistan) is director of the Max Planck Institute for Solar System Research (MPS), director of the Sun-Heliosphere Department of MPS, a scientific member of the Max Planck Society, and a Chair (and spokesperson) of the International Max Planck Research School on Physical Processes in the Solar System and Beyond at the Universities of Braunschweig and Göttingen.

Solanki is also an honorary professor at the Institute of Astronomy at the Swiss Federal Institute of Technology Zurich, and (2) Institute for Geophysics and Extraterrestrial Physics at the Braunschweig University of Technology in Germany. In addition, he is a distinguished professor at the Kyung Hee University in Korea.

He is the editor-in-chief of the Living Reviews in Solar Physics, an exclusively web-based, peer-reviewed journal, publishing reviews of research in all areas of solar and heliospheric physics. Living Reviews in Solar Physics was recently rated with an impact factor of 17.636 taking the third place in the "Astronomy & Astrophysics" category.

Solanki's main topics of research are:

- Solar and heliospheric physics, in particular solar magnetism and Sun-Earth relations
- Stellar astrophysics, mainly stellar activity and magnetism
- Astronomical tests of theories of gravitation
- Atomic and molecular physics of astronomical interest
- Protoplanetary discs and extrasolar planets
- Radiative transfer of polarised light

He has also held these positions: (1) Vice-Chairman and member of the Senate Committee of the German Aerospace Centre (DLR); (2) Member Appointment Committee and Committee of Three of the DLR; (3) Member Extraterrestrial Program Committee of the DLR; (4) Science Advisory Committee of the High Altitude Observatory, Boulder/USA; (5) Science Advisory Board at the Istituto Ricerche Solari (IRSOL), Locarno/Switzerland; and has contributed to the following space/balloon projects:

- Sunrise (PI)
- STEREO Secchi (Co-I)
- SDO HMI (Co-I)
- Solar Orbiter PHI (PI)

== Academic career ==
- 1987 Doctorate from the Eidgenössische Technische Hochschule Zürich
- 1987–1989 Post doc at the University of St Andrews, Scotland.
- 1992 Habilitation
- 1998 Professor of Astronomy at the University of Oulu in Finland
- 1999 Minnaert guest professor at the University of Utrecht
- 1999 Director of the Max Planck Institute for Solar System Research

== Awards and honours ==
- 2001 Honorary professor at the Eidgenössische Technische Hochschule
- 2003 Honorary professor at the Technische Universität Braunschweig
- 2006 Associateship of the Royal Astronomical Society
- 2008 Presented the Bernard Price Memorial Lecture in South Africa
- 2022 George Ellery Hale Prize
- 2026 Fellow of the Royal Society

In 2011, Solanki delivered a lecture, "Is the Sun to Blame for Global Warming?," at the first Starmus Festival in the Canary Islands. His talk was subsequently published in the book Starmus: 50 Years of Man in Space.

== Controversy ==
Solanki's research has been quoted as being part of the Global warming controversy, for instance in an article in the Telegraph in 2004 as taking a sceptical position:

the impact of more intense sunshine on the ozone layer and on cloud cover could be affecting the climate more than the sunlight itself

But the same research has been quoted as being evidence for global warming in a news release from the Max Planck Society though he is quoted as calling for further investigation, saying:

"Just how large this role is, must still be investigated, since, according to our latest knowledge on the variations of the solar magnetic field, the significant increase in the Earth's temperature since 1980 is indeed to be ascribed to the greenhouse effect caused by carbon dioxide,"

== Selected publications ==
- Solanki, Sami K.; Usoskin, Ilya G.; Kromer, Bernd; Schüssler, Manfred; Beer, Jürg (2004), "Unusual activity of the Sun during recent decades compared to the previous 11,000 years" (PDF), Nature, 431 (7012): 1084–1087, Bibcode:2004Natur.431.1084S, doi:10.1038/nature02995, PMID 15510145, S2CID 4373732
- Solanki, Sami K.; Haugan, Mark P. (1996), "New constraints on gravity-induced birefringence", Physical Review, 53 (2): 997–1000, Bibcode:1996PhRvD..53..997S, doi:10.1103/PhysRevD.53.997, PMID 10020087
- Solanki, Sami K.; Krivova, Natalia A. (2003), "Can solar variability explain global warming since 1970?" (PDF), Journal of Geophysical Research, 108 (A5): 7.1 – 7.8, Bibcode:2003JGRA..108.1200S, doi:10.1029/2002JA009753
- Usoskin, Ilya G.; Solanki, Sami K.; Schüssler, Manfred; Mursula, Kalevi; Alanko, Katja (2003), "A Millennium Scale Sunspot Number Reconstruction: Evidence For an Unusually Active Sun Since the 1940s", Physical Review Letters, 91 (21) 211101, arXiv:astro-ph/0310823, Bibcode:2003PhRvL..91u1101U, doi:10.1103/PhysRevLett.91.211101, PMID 14683287, S2CID 20754479
- Solanki, Sami K. (1993), "Small-scale solar magnetic fields: An overview", Space Science Reviews, 63 (1–2): 1–188, Bibcode:1993SSRv...63....1S, doi:10.1007/BF00749277, S2CID 120438069
- Schuessler, M.; Solanki, Sami K. (1992), "Why rapid rotators have polar spots", Astronomy & Astrophysics, 264 (1): L13–L16, Bibcode:1992A&A...264L..13S
- Solanki, Sami K. (1986), "Velocities in solar magnetic fluxtubes", Astronomy & Astrophysics, 168 (1–2): 311–329, Bibcode:1986A&A...168..311S
- Solanki, Sami K.; Stenflo, J.O. (1984), "Properties of solar magnetic fluxtubes as revealed by Fe I lines", Astronomy & Astrophysics, 140 (1): 185–198, Bibcode:1992A&A...264L..13S
