= Erich Regener =

German physicist (1881–1955)

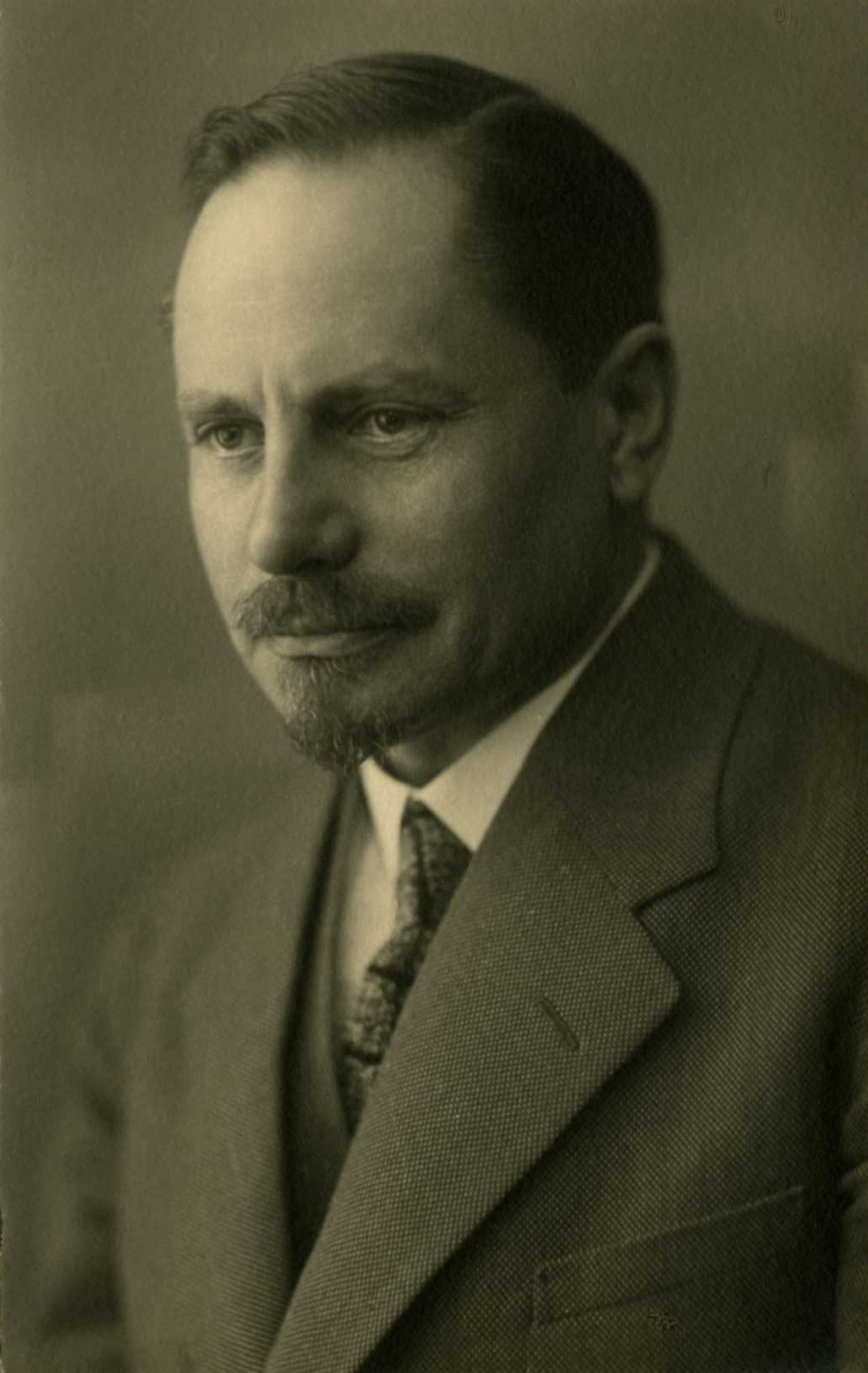
- Erich Regener, May 1929
- Born: 12 November 1881; Schleusenau, West Prussia
- Died: 27 February 1955 (aged 73); Stuttgart, Baden-Württemberg
- Education: University of Berlin
- Known for: Instruments to measure cosmic rays at various altitudes
- Children: 2
- Scientific career
- Fields: Experimental physics
- Workplaces: Agricultural University of Berlin; University of Stuttgart
- Doctoral advisor: Emil Warburg
- Doctoral students: Hans Hellmann; Debendra Mohan Bose; Herman Hoerlin

Erich Rudolf Alexander Regener (12 November 1881 – 27 February 1955) was a German physicist known primarily for the design and construction of instruments to measure cosmic ray intensity at various altitudes. He is also known for predicting a 2.8 K for the temperature of the cosmic microwave background, for the invention of the scintillation counter which contributed to the discovery of the structure of the atom, for his calculation of the charge of an electron and for his early work on atmospheric ozone. He is also credited with the first use of rockets for scientific research.

== Life ==
Regener was born in Schleusenau near Bromberg (Bydgoszcz), West Prussia. He studied physics from 1900 to 1905 at the University of Berlin under Emil Warburg and from 1909 worked with Heinrich Rubens. In 1911 he became professor of experimental physics and meteorology at the Agricultural University of Berlin.

=== Nazi era ===
In 1920 he became the professor in experimental physics at the University of Stuttgart working alongside the theoretical physicist Paul Peter Ewald. During this time, he developed instruments to measure cosmic rays at various altitudes. Regener's leadership in this field is not always fully recognised as he was persecuted during the Nazi era because his wife was of Jewish ancestry. It has been argued that the naming of terms such as Pfotzer maximum after his student Georg Pfotzer is misleading as Regener was the principal scientist for this work.

Bruno Rossi wrote of this period that

"In the late 1920s and early 1930s the technique of self-recording electroscopes carried by balloons into the highest layers of the atmosphere or sunk to great depths under water was brought to an unprecedented degree of perfection by the German physicist Erich Regener and his group. To these scientists we owe some of the most accurate measurements ever made of cosmic-ray ionization as a function of altitude and depth."

Ernest Rutherford stated in 1931 that

"thanks to the fine experiments of Professor Millikan and the even more far-reaching experiments of Professor Regener, we have now got for the first time, a curve of absorption of these radiations in water which we may safely rely upon."

In 1937 Regener was forced into "provisional retirement" by the National Socialists. He then founded the private "Research Laboratory for the Physics of the Stratosphere" in Friedrichshafen on Lake Constance, which later became a part of the Kaiser Wilhelm Society. In 1939 he was invited to work at the German Army-Air Force rocket research station in Peenemünde where he developed a spectrograph protected by a steel casing. This instrument, later called the Regener-Tonne was the first scientific payload for a rocket designed to reach high altitude. Regener overcame the problems of getting the parachute canopy to open at extreme high altitudes by inflating the parachute with compressed air. After a successful test flight the project was cancelled in September 1944 and the rockets were used as long-range missiles against Britain. The capsule disappeared after Peenemunde tests in 1944 but later resurfaced in the United States.

=== After World War II ===
In 1948 Regener was appointed the first vice president of the Max Planck Society. He was also cofounder of the Max Planck Institute for Solar System Research with Walter Dieminger and was instrumental in attracting physicists back to post-war Germany.

== Personal life ==
Regener was the father of physicist Victor H. Regener and Erika Regener. Erika Regener later married one of Erich Regener's students, Henri Daniel Rathgeber.

== Publications ==
- Über die chemische Wirkung kurzwelliger Strahlung auf gasförmige Körper, Dissertation, Friedrich-Wilhelms-Universität zu Berlin, 12. Aug. 1905
- Meyer, E; Erich Regener (1908). "Concerning Oscillation of Radioactive Radiation and a Method for Determining the Electric Element Quantum". Annalen der Physik (in German). 25 (4): 757–774. Bibcode:1908AnP...330..757M. doi:10.1002/andp.19083300408.
- Regener, Erich (1909). "On Counting the Alpha Particles by Scintillation and on the Size of the Electrical Elementary Quantum". Sitzungsberichte der Koniglich Preussischen Akademie der Wissenschaften (in German): 948–965.
- Regener, Erich (1913). "Die neuen Versuche von C.T.R. Wilson zur Sichtbarmachung der Bahnen der radioaktiven Strahlen" [The New Attempts of C T R Wilson for the Visualisation of the Tracks of Radiation Rays]. Naturwissenschaften (in German). 1 (13): 299–302. Bibcode:1913NW......1..299R. doi:10.1007/BF01503917. S2CID 36596908.
- Über Kathoden-, Röntgen- und Radiumstrahlen, Rede, geh. in d. Kgl. Landwirtschaftlichen Hochschule zu Berlin am 26. Jan. 1915. Berlin; Wien : Urban & Schwarzenberg, 1915
- Über die Ursache, welche bei den Versuchen von Hrn. F. Ehrenhaft die Existenz eines Subelektrons vortäuscht, Berlin 1920 (Sitzungsbericht d. Preuss. Akademie d. Wiss. Phys.-math. Kl. 1920)
- Regener, Erich; Lise Meitner; P. Jordan (1927). "Besprechungen". Die Naturwissenschaften (in German). 15 (38): 789–792. Bibcode:1927NW.....15..789R. doi:10.1007/BF01504664.
- Regener, Erich; Victor H. Regener (1934). "Aufnahmen des ultravioletten Sonnenspektums in der Stratosphäre und vertikale Ozonverteilun". Phys. Z. (in German). 35: 788–793.
- Regener, Erich; Georg Pfotzer (November 1935). "Vertical Intensity of Cosmic Rays by Threefold Coincidences in the Stratosphere". Nature. 136 (3444): 718–719. Bibcode:1935Natur.136..718R. doi:10.1038/136718a0. S2CID 4087956.
- Über Ballone mit großer Steiggeschwindigkeit, Thermographen von geringer Trägheit, Quarzbarographen und über die Kondensation und Sublimation von Wasserdampfes bei tiefen Temperaturen, München; Berlin: Oldenbourg, 1941 (Schriften d. Dt. Akademie d. Luftfahrtforschung 37)
- Aufbau und Zusammensetzung der Stratosphäre, München; Berlin: Oldenbourg, 1941 (Schriften der Deutschen Akademie der Luftfahrtforschung 46)
- Optische Interferenzen an dünnen, bei 190 °C kondensierten Eisschichten, 1954
