= Sunrise (telescope) =

Balloon-borne solar observatory

Sunrise Balloon-Borne Solar Observatory
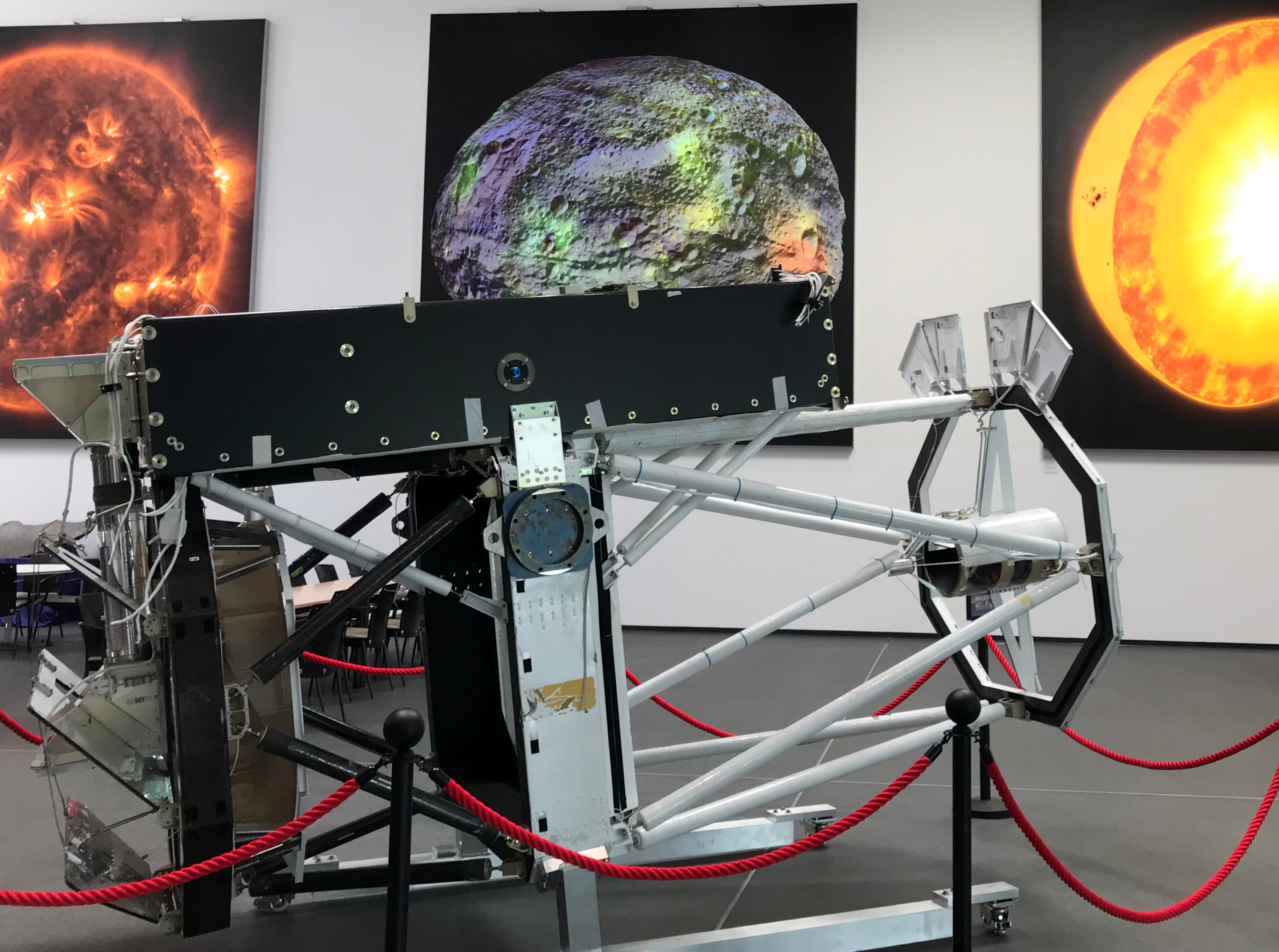
- Sunrise telescope in the Max Planck Institute for Solar System Research
- Mission type: Balloon-borne telescope
- Operator: Max Planck Institute for Solar System Research (MPS)
- Website: www.mps.mpg.de/solar-physics/sunrise
- Mission duration: 6 days (2009); 5 days (2013); 6 days (2024)

Spacecraft properties
- Manufacturer: Max Planck Institute for Solar System Research; Kiepenheuer Institute for Solar Physics; High Altitude Observatory; Lockheed Martin Solar and Astrophysics Laboratory; Instituto de Astrofísica de Canarias; Instituto Nacional de Técnica Aeroespacial; Instituto de Astrofísica de Andalucía; Grupo de Astronomía y Ciencias del Espacio
- Launch mass: 2 t (2.0 long tons; 2.2 short tons)
- Power: 1.5 kW

Start of mission
- Launch date: 8 June 2009; 12 June 2013; 10 July 2024
- Launch site: Esrange Space Center; Kiruna, Sweden

End of mission
- Landing date: 14 June 2009; 17 June 2013; 16 July 2024
- Landing site: Nunavut, Canada

Main telescope
- Wavelengths: SuFI: 225, 280, 300, 313, 388 nm IMaX: 525.06 nm SUPOS: 854, 853.8 nm
- Resolution: 0.13-0.15 arcsec
Instruments
- SuFI: UV Filtergraph
- IMaX: Imaging Magnetograph
- SUPOS: Polarimetric Spectrograph (not in 2009)

Sunrise is a balloon-borne astronomical observatory designed to observe the Sun's photosphere and chromosphere. It carries a 1-metre solar telescope that redirects infrared, visible, and ultraviolet radiation from the Sun to a suite of scientific instruments. Sunrise is managed by the Max Planck Institute for Solar System Research.

Sunrise completed three successful science flights between 2009 and 2024. Sunrise I and II, flown in June 2009 and June 2013, respectively, both carried an imager and magnetograph. Sunrise III, flown in July 2024, carried updated instrumentation including two slit-based spectropolarimeters and a new magnetograph. All three flights were launched from the Esrange Space Center near Kiruna, Sweden and around the Northern-Hemisphere summer solstice when the polar day allowed for continuous observation of the Sun.

The first science flight of Sunrise yielded high-quality data that reveal the structure, dynamics and evolution of solar convection, oscillations and magnetic fields at a resolution of around 100 km in the quiet Sun.

== Overview ==
The strong absorption of UV radiation by the Earth's atmosphere makes it challenging to carry out ground-based observations at these wavelengths. A balloon mission reaching altitudes of above 30 km benefits from a reduction of UV absorption by 99%, making engineering solutions for the telescope easier. The launch site was in the arctic region to make uninterrupted observation of the Sun over several days possible. The telescope has a 1 metre primary mirror that directs the 1 kW of solar radiation to the first focal point where 99% of the radiation is reflected out of the telescope, the remaining light is transferred into several instruments.

The one metre diameter primary mirror is made from a glass ceramic zerodur, it is the central part of the gondola of nearly 2 tons. Solar panels of 1.5 kW output power are used to power the onboard equipment and a hard disk array of 2 x 2.4 Terabyte is used to store the data during flight.

== Instruments ==
- CWS, Correlating Wavefront Sensor is a CCD camera with 1 kHz read-outs responsible generate the images necessary for image stabilization and proper alignment.
- SUFI, Sunrise Filter Imager observes the sun in five distinct wavelengths 214, 300, 312, 388 and 397 nm, on a 2048 x 2048 pixel CCD, through a filter wheel.
- IMaX, Imaging Magnetograph eXperiment observes the Zeeman splitting of the iron line (FeI) around 525 nm. The observed field of view is 50 x 50 arcseconds.

== Flights ==
Sunrise completed successful science flights in June 2009, June 2013, and July 2024. For all three flights, Sunrise was launched from the Esrange Space Center near Kiruna, Sweden. These flights took place during a 40-day window defined by the period of persistent polar day around the Northern-Hemisphere summer solstice and the presence of circumpolar stratospheric winds. The polar day allowed for continuous observation of the Sun, while stratospheric winds were necessary to transport the balloon westward to northern Canada.

=== Sunrise I ===
Sunrise's first flight, Sunrise I, was launched at 06:27 UTC on 8 June 2009 and landed at 23:47 UTC on 13 June 2009 on Somerset Island, Nunavut, northern Canada after a flight duration of nearly six days.

=== Sunrise II ===
Sunrise's second flight, Sunrise II, was launched at 05:37 UTC on 12 June 2013 and was terminated at 11:49 UTC on 17 June 2013, landing about one hour later on the Boothia peninsula, Nunavut, northern Canada after a flight duration of over 5 days.

=== Sunrise III ===
Sunrise's third flight, Sunrise III, was launched at 04:22 UTC on 10 July 2024 and landed at 19:09 UTC on 16 July 2024 between Mackenzie River and Great Bear Lake in Canada. The third edition of sunrise is a step forward in terms of onboard instrumentation, with three new instruments, SUSI, SCIP, and TuMAG.

== See also ==
- List of solar telescopes
- Hinode
- Swedish Solar Telescope
