= Hans Hellmann =

German theoretical physicist (1903–1938)

Hans Gustav Adolf Hellmann
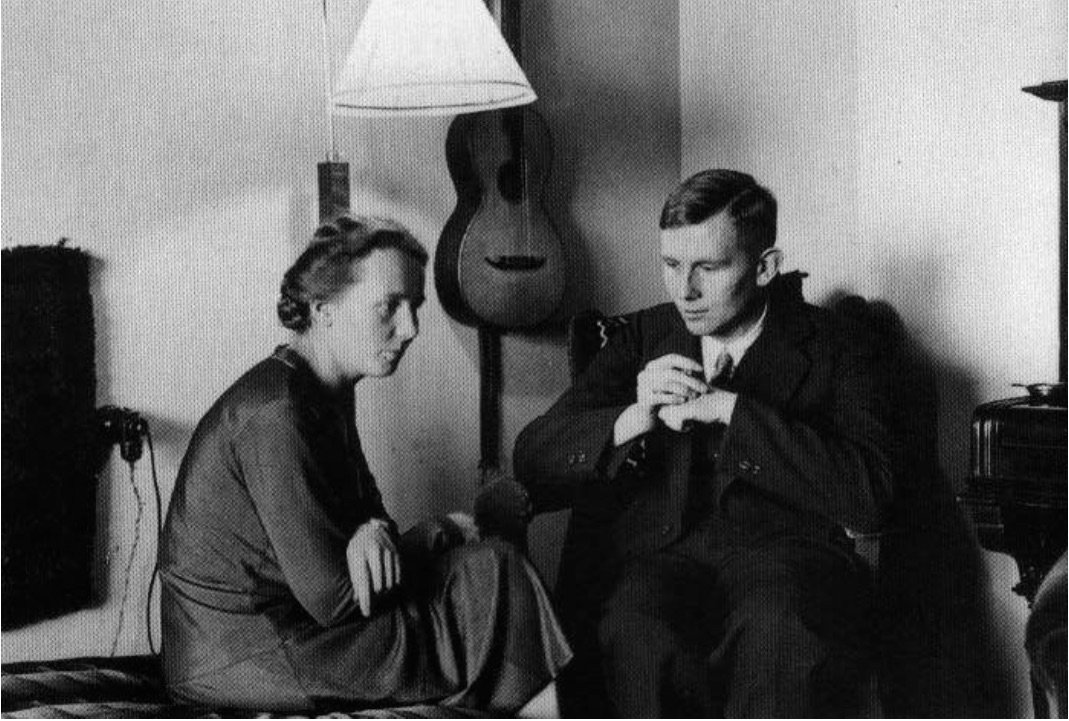
- Hans Hellmann and his sister Greta. 1930
- Born: 14 October 1903; Wilhelmshaven, German Empire
- Died: 29 May 1938 (aged 34); Moscow, Soviet Union
- Education: University of Stuttgart; University of Kiel; Kaiser Wilhelm Institute for Chemistry
- Known for: Hellmann–Feynman theorem Pseudopotential
- Scientific career
- Workplaces: Leibniz University Hannover
- Doctoral advisor: Erich Regener

Hans Gustav Adolf Hellmann (14 October 1903 – 29 May 1938) was a German theoretical physicist.

== Biography ==
Hellmann was born in Wilhelmshaven, Prussian Hanover. He began studying electrical engineering in Stuttgart but changed to engineering physics after a semester. Hellmann also studied at the University of Kiel.

He received his diploma from the Kaiser Wilhelm Institute for Chemistry in Berlin for work on radioactive compounds under Otto Hahn and Lise Meitner. He received his Ph.D. at Stuttgart with Prof. Erich Regener for work on the decomposition of ozone. Hellmann's future spouse Victoria Bernstein was the foster daughter of Regener. In 1929 Hellmann became an assistant professor at the Leibniz University Hannover.

After the Nazi rise to power, Hellmann was dismissed on 24 December 1933 as 'undesirable' because of his Jewish wife. He emigrated to the Soviet Union, taking up a position at the Karpov institute in Moscow working among other things on pseudopotentials. However, he was later denounced during the Great Purge, imprisoned on 10 May 1938 and executed in Butovo on 29 May. His son, Hans Hellmann, Jr., was only allowed to leave the former Soviet Union in 1991.

In science, his name is primarily associated with the Hellmann–Feynman theorem, as well as with one of the first-ever textbooks on quantum chemistry ('Kvantovaya Khimiya', 1937; translated into German as 'Einfuehrung in die Quantenchemie', Vienna, 1937). He pioneered several approaches now commonplace in quantum chemistry, notably the use of pseudopotentials.
