= Georg Pfotzer =

German physicist

Georg Pfotzer (29 November 1909 – 24 July 1981) was a German physicist.

He was a student of Erich Regener in the 1930s and worked with Regener to investigate cosmic rays by using balloons to carry scientific instruments such as Geiger counters to the upper atmosphere. The terms Pfotzer curve and Pfotzer maximum, relating to the distribution of charged particles in the atmosphere resulting from cosmic rays, are named after him. It has been suggested that this is misleading, as Regener was the principal investigator, but he was persecuted and forced to resign during the Nazi era as his wife was of Jewish ancestry.

He was director of the Max Planck Institute for Solar System Research between 1965 and 1977.

== Publications ==
- Regener, E. and Pfotzer, G.: Messungen der Ultrastrahlung in der oberen Atmosphäre mit dem Zählrohr (in German), Phys. Zeit. 35, 779–784, 1934.
- Regener E. and Pfotzer, G.: Intensity of the Cosmic Ultra-Radiation in the Stratosphere with the Tube-Counter, Nature, 134, 325–325, 1935
- Regener, Erich; Georg Pfotzer (November 1935). "Vertical Intensity of Cosmic Rays by Threefold Coincidences in the Stratosphere". Nature. 136 (3444): 718–719. Bibcode:1935Natur.136..718R. doi:10.1038/136718a0. S2CID 4087956.
- Pfotzer, Georg (1985). "Erich Regener's Cosmic Ray Work in Stuttgart and Related Subjects". In Yataro Sekido and Harry Elliot (ed.). Early History of Cosmic Ray Studies. Astrophysics and Space Science Library. Vol. 118. Dordrecht, Holland: D. Riedel Publishing Company.
