= Regener-Tonne =

External images
- Regener spectrograph components, collection of Smithsonian: National Air and Space Museum

The Regener barrel (German: Regener-Tonne) was the name of a scientific payload for the World War II V-2 rocket.

Mid-1942 plans for subsequent launches to study upper-atmospheric guidance and science were not carried out due to the need for test launches and the eventual advance of the Russian armies.

The first meeting was held on July 8, 1942, at the Peenemünde Army Research Station under the direction of Wernher von Braun with the participation of Erich Regener, Ernst Steinhoff, Gerhard Reisig, Helmut Gröttrup, Alfred Ehmert, and Erwin Schopper, among others. Wernher von Braun also tried to win Manfred von Ardenne for cooperation, but he declined.

Instrumentation had been contracted on July 11, 1942; and the Research Foundation for the Physics of the Stratosphere was to develop the "Regener barrel" with a quartz barograph, a recording thermometer, an ultraviolet spectrograph, and an air sampler.

By January 18, 1945, rumors of nearby Soviet tanks resulted in Erich Regener's organization being sent from Peenemünde before the A-4 instrument package had been finished. The Regener-Tonne parachute was tested at Test Stand VII of the Peenemünde Army Research Center and a mock-up was launched in January 1945.
