= Vytenis Vasyliunas =

Lithuanian space scientist

Vytenis Marija Vasyliunas
- Born: 25 September 1939 (age 86); Kaunas, Lithuania
- Education: Massachusetts Institute of Technology
- Scientific career
- Workplaces: Harvard College 1958–1962 Massachusetts Institute of Technology 1962–1966 Max Planck Institute for Solar System Research 1962–1966

Vytenis M. Vasyliunas FRS (born 25 September 1939) is a Lithuanian space scientist who was director of Germany's Max Planck Institute for Solar System Research from 1977 to 2007.

== Life and work ==
Vasyliunas was born as son of the Lithuanian violinist Izidorius Vasyliūnas in 1939. He studied at Harvard College and received a degree in 1962. At the Massachusetts Institute of Technology he received his Ph.D. in 1966. In the following years he was Sloan Fellow and received the James B. Macelwane Medal in 1975.

From 1977 to 2007 he was one of the directors of Germany's Max Planck Institute for Solar System Research.
