= Henri Daniel Rathgeber =

Australian physicist

- Born: 11 June 1908; Montmartre, Paris, France
- Died: 20 June 1995 (aged 87); Sydney, Australia
- Citizenship: Germany, Australia
- Education: Stuttgart Technische Hochschule
- Known for: Entropy and Economics
- Awards: Syme Prize, 1952
- Scientific career
- Fields: Experimental physicist
- Workplaces: University of Melbourne; University of Sydney
- Doctoral advisor: Erich Regener

Henri Daniel Rathgeber (11 June 1908 – 20 July 1995) was an Australian physicist who studied cosmic rays but considered his most important contribution to be an economic theory that explain how entropy causes unemployment.

== Education ==
Rathgeber was born in Montmartre, Paris on 11 June 1908. His father, Daniel Rathgeber was German, working for Robert Bosch GmbH, and his mother Hortense Desmousseaux was French. Just before the outbreak of first world war, he moved to Bad Dürkheim with his French mother, while his father served in the German army. From 1919-1924 he lived in Geneva, Switzerland and went to school at the College. In 1934 he completed an undergraduate degree at the Technische Hochschule in Stuttgart and in 1938 completed his doctorate in physics. During this period the physics department was very active at the Technische Hochschule, with teachers such as Erwin Schrödinger, Erich Regener and Paul Peter Ewald. Rathgeber played an important role in Erich Regener's aerial cosmic ray measurements, as he was the only student at that time who owned a car, and was therefore asked to collect the balloons and measuring apparatus, which could travel up to a distance of 200 km from Stuttgart. On 2 August 1932 Rathgeber married Erich Regener's daughter, Erika Regener.

== Career ==
In 1939 Rathgeber emigrated to Melbourne, Australia with his wife and two children. From 1940 to 1946 he worked as a part-time as a research physicist with the Optical Munitions Panel at the University of Melbourne. In 1940 he obtained the Thomas Lyle fellowship in physics at the University of Melbourne. In 1952 he shared the David Syme Research Prize and was asked by Harry Messel to take up a position as a reader at the University of Sydney.

== Economics research ==
During the inter-war period, Rathgeber was heavily influenced by the economic ideas of Silvio Gesell which were popular in Germany at the time. Rathgeber retired in 1973 and in retirement returned to his earlier interest in economics and its connection with physics and in particular entropy and control system design. In 1974 he developed a theory explaining how random noise in the form of an error rate, as defined in Claude Shannon's information theory causes an inverse linear relationship between unemployment and inflation, but at the time such ideas were not taken seriously. Rathgeber continued to write various unpublished papers about his theory. He died in Sydney in 1995.
