= Max Planck Institute for Solar System Research =

Space research institute in Germany

Coordinates: 51°33′37″N 9°56′58″E

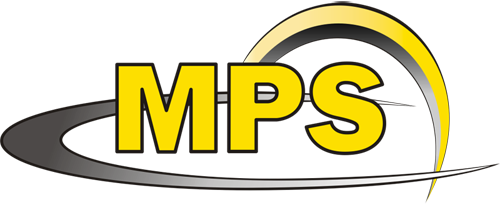
- Abbreviation: MPS
- Formation: 1934 (founded as the Luftwaffe test grounds in Rechlin/Mecklenburg) / July 1, 2004 (renamed to the Max Planck Institute for Solar System Research)
- Type: Research Institute
- Location: Göttingen, Germany
- Managing Director: Prof. Dr. Laurent Gizon
- Parent organization: Max Planck Society
- Affiliations: Max Planck Institute for Solar System Research / Max-Planck-Institut für Sonnensystemforschung
- Staff: 320
- Website: www.mps.mpg.de

The Max Planck Institute for Solar System Research (abbreviation: MPS; German: Max-Planck-Institut für Sonnensystemforschung) is a research institute in astronomy and astrophysics located in Göttingen, Germany, where it relocated in February 2014 from the nearby village of Lindau. The exploration of the Solar System is the central theme for research done at this institute.

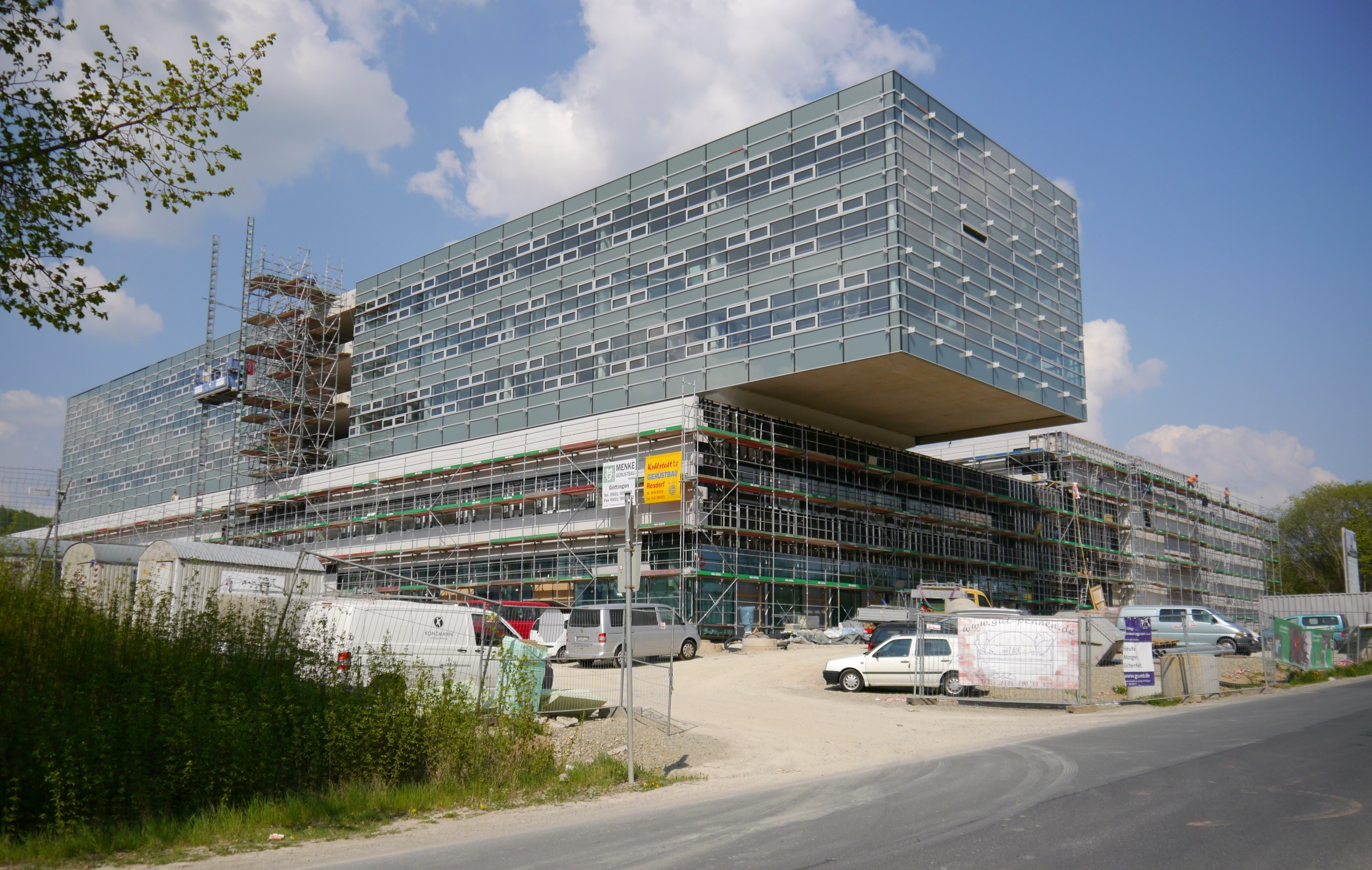
New Institute building in Göttingen, built in 2013 and occupied in 2014

MPS is a part of the Max Planck Society, which operates 80 research facilities in Germany.

== Research ==
MPS is organised in three departments: Sun and Heliosphere, Planets and Comets, and Solar and Stellar Interiors. In addition, since 2002 there is also an International Max Planck Research School. Subjects of research at the institute are the various objects within the Solar System. A major area of study concerns the Sun, its atmosphere, the interplanetary medium as influenced by the solar wind, as well as the impact of solar particles and radiation on the planets. The second area of research involves the interiors, surfaces, atmospheres, ionospheres, and magnetospheres of the planets and their moons, as well as of comets and asteroids. A further essential part of the activities at the institute is the development and construction of instruments for space missions. The analysis and interpretation of the acquired datasets are accompanied by intensive theoretical work. Physical models are proposed and then tested and further developed with the aid of computer simulations.

=== The Sun and heliosphere ===
The researchers at the MPS are studying the complete range of dynamic and often spectacular processes occurring on the Sun – from the interior to the outer heliosphere. At the heart of this research is the magnetic field, which plays a decisive role in these processes. It is generated by gas currents in the interior of the Sun and causes, among other things, dark spots on the surface. Answers to the following questions are being sought: Why does the magnetic field change with an eleven-year cycle? How does the magnetic field produce the various structures on the Sun? How is the corona heated to many millions of degrees? Instruments developed by MPS aboard the space- craft SOHO and Ulysses have provided fundamentally new insights: Measurements of the ultraviolet spectrometer SUMER on board SOHO played a decisive role in recognizing the significance of the magnetic field for dynamic processes and Ulysses measured the three-dimensional structure of the solar wind for the first time. Another important research topic at "The Sun and Heliosphere" department is the influence on the Earth due to the Sun's variable activity. Scientists are working intensively on the project STEREO, in which two identical spacecraft trace disturbances from the Sun to the Earth from different observational points, permitting predictions of potentially dangerous events. The physical processes involved in the origin and development of magnetic fields on the Sun take place on very small scales and therefore require measurements with very high spatial resolution. The balloon-borne telescope Sunrise, built under Institute leadership and flown in June 2009, was able to make out structures on the Sun's surface as small as about 100 kilometers. Future projects will stress research into the physical causes of the Sun's variations. The Solar Orbiter mission, based on a suggestion from the institute, was launched in February 2020 and comes within about 42 million kilometers of the Sun to study it up close and from high latitudes; the institute leads its Polarimetric and Helioseismic Imager.

=== Planets and comets ===
The institute develops scientific instruments that fly with spacecraft to other planets. Highly specialized cameras have investigated the Saturn moon Titan, analyse the surface of Mars, and probe the clouds and winds of Venus. Microwave instruments determine the composition of atmospheres while infrared spectrometers examine surface rocks. A novel laser altimeter on board BepiColombo, BELA, is designed to survey the topography of Mercury with a ranging accuracy better than 2 meters. Further MPS instruments identify the atoms, electrons, and dust that move around the planets and impact their moons. Here the influence of the solar wind on the atmospheric gases is of particular interest. Theoretical studies and intensive computer simulations help to understand the processes both inside and surrounding the planets and to interpret the measured data. Models developed at MPS can describe, for example, interactions with the solar wind, the atmospheric dynamics, or the generation of the terrestrial magnetic field by means of currents deep in the iron core of our planet. In addition, the institute has along tradition in cometary research. A major highlight was the camera developed at the institute for the ESA spacecraft Giotto which delivered the first photographs ever of a comet's nucleus in 1986. A particular challenge was the development of numerous scientific instruments for the ESA Mission Rosetta, such as cameras, chemical analyzers, and essential components for the landing module Philae. Rosetta was launched in 2004, and matched orbits with the comet Churyumov-Gerasimenko in 2014; a few months later, Philae landed on the comet's surface. The institute has also provided the cameras for the NASA Dawn Mission, launched in 2007, to study two of the largest asteroids, Ceres and Vesta.

=== Helio- and Asteroseismology ===
The MPS is hosting the German Data Centre for NASA's Solar Dynamics Observatory (SDO), which has provided improved data on small scales of space and time to study the connections between the solar interior and magnetic activity in the solar atmosphere. A particularly exciting research activity at the MPS is the study of seismic waves in the vicinity of sunspots. The goal is to probe the subsurface structure of sunspots in three dimensions. Sunspot helioseismology is a challenging science as it requires modelling of the propagation of waves through magnetic structures; this can only be achieved by numerical simulations.

== Scientific projects ==
The institute has led, or been involved with, several international scientific projects such as:

Solar Orbiter, SDO, Sunrise, STEREO, SOHO, Ulysses, BepiColombo, Exomars, Chandrayaan, Phoenix, Herschel, Dawn, Venus Express, SMART-1, SOFIA, Rosetta, Mars Express, Mars DFG, Cassini, Cluster, Helios, Galileo and Giotto.

These contributions consist developing of the instruments and/or scientific research activities.

== Degree programme ==
The MPI for Solar System Research offers the PhD programme "International Max Planck Research School (IMPRS) for Solar System Science" together with the University of Göttingen. The Solar System School offers a three-year course of study emphasizing actual research. The curriculum covers the entire area of the Solar System from small bodies to the planets and the Sun. The goal is a broad, interdisciplinary, and solid scientific education, extended with courses in numerical physics, space technology, project management, scientific writing, and presentation techniques. There are usually about 50 graduate students studying at the Solar System School. Two thirds are from abroad from over 30 different countries. About 30 percent are women.

== History ==
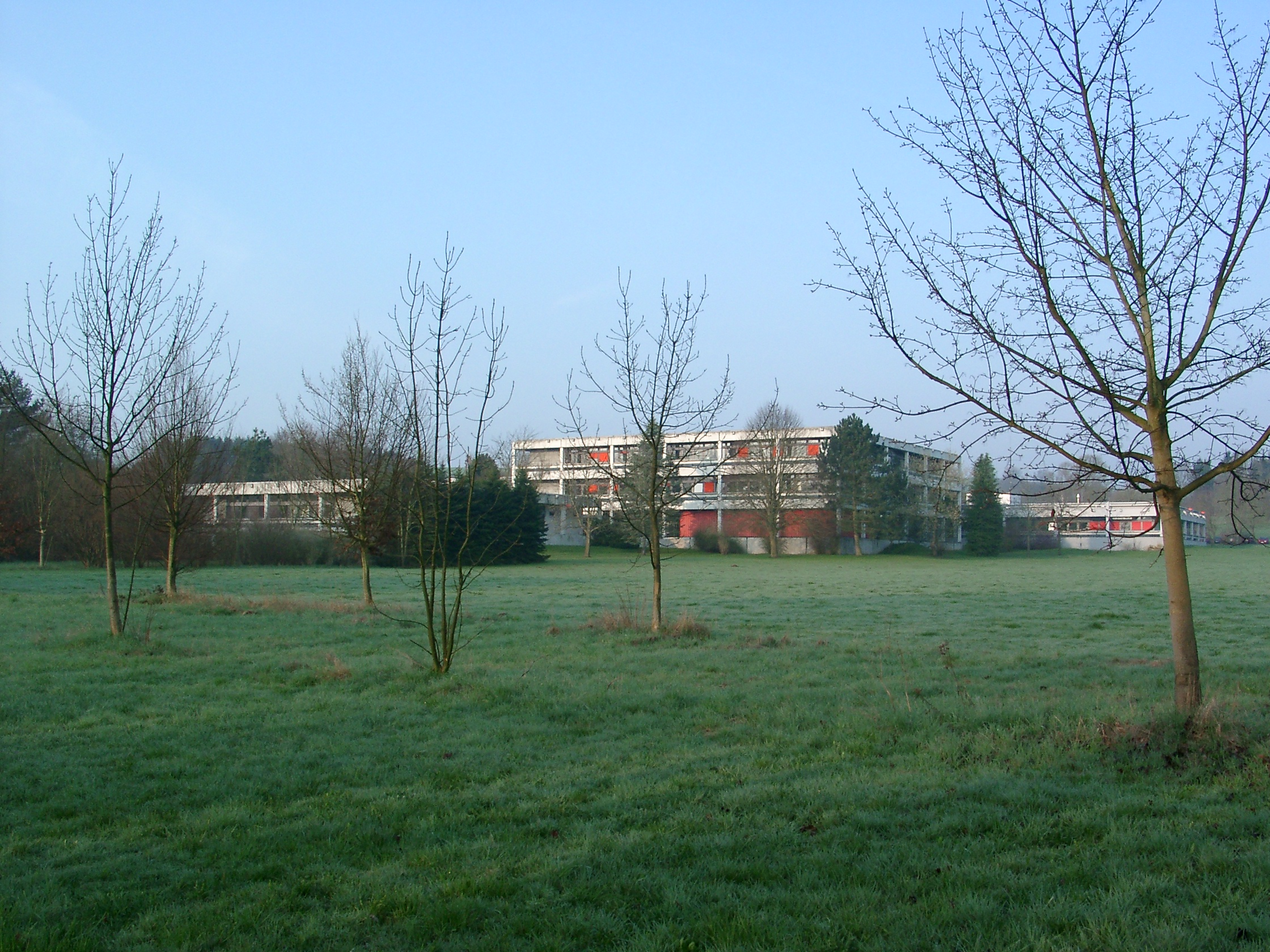
Max Planck Institute for Solar System Research – April 2006

The institute was founded by Walter Dieminger, who was head of the Luftwaffe test center at Rechlin at the Müritz from 1934 onwards. Erich Regener was cofounder. After being renamed to the "Centre for Radio Transmission" in 1943 and moving to Leobersdorf in 1944, the institute was united with the Fraunhofer institute from Freiburg at Ried in the Innkreis. After the war an Allied commission decided to move the institute to Lindau am Harz, where buildings of the Technical University of Hannover already existed. The convoy arrived on the 2nd and 3 March 1946. During 1948 the radio institute of the Kaiser Wilhelm Society was transferred from the Fraunhofer Society to the Max Planck Society and renamed "Institute for Ionosphere Research" in 1949. In 1950 the US Air Force paid for the construction of an ionospheric echolot system. The full transfer from Fraunhofer to Max Planck Society and the appointment of W. Dieminger as director followed by the transfer of the Max Planck Institute of Stratosphere Research from Weisenau near Ravensburg to Lindau and another renaming to "Max Planck Institute for Aeronomy" completed the built up.

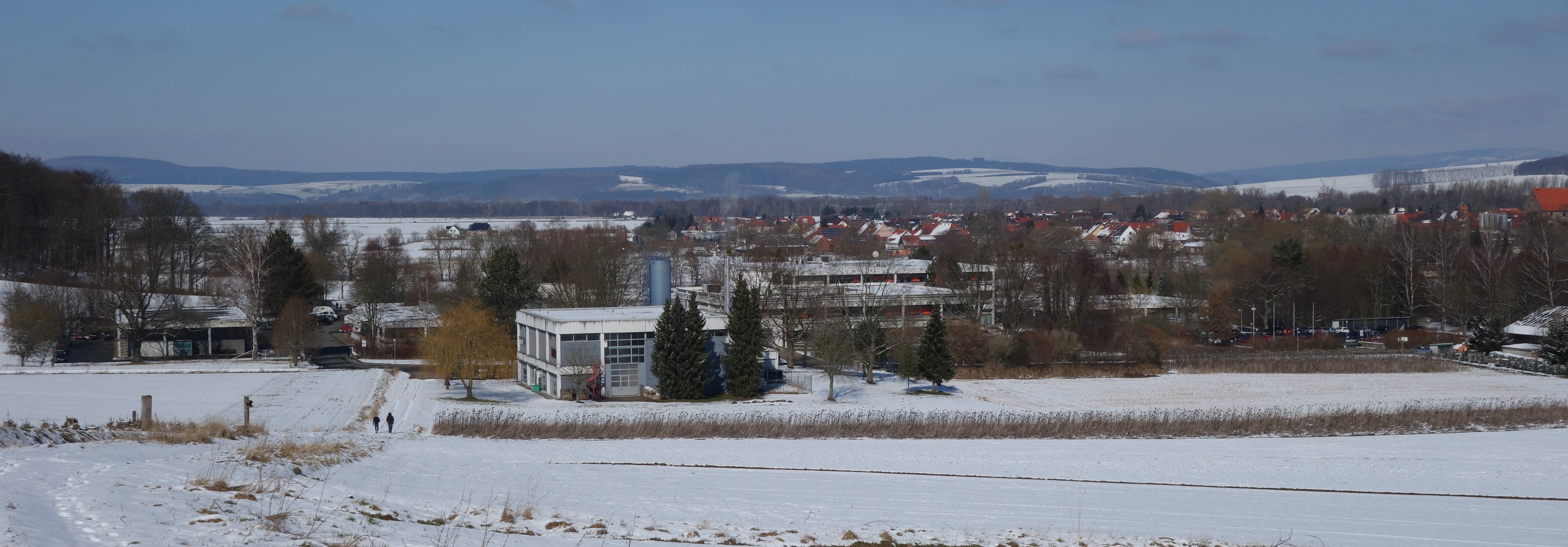
Max Planck Institute for Solar System Research in Lindau, about a year before relocating – March 2013

Erhard Keppler became the science lead in the first German satellite Azur (in cooperation with NASA) and with him a small group of scientists dedicated to work with satellites was established in Lindau. The institute was selected to build part of the instrumentation of the satellite which was launched in November 1969. The institute also built instruments for the Helios probes as part of another Germany/NASA cooperation.

After the retirement of W. Dieminger in 1974 the focus changed from atmospheric research to space research. The institute participated in a long series of space missions like Galileo, Ulysses, Cluster, SOHO, Cassini-Huygens, Rosetta, Mars Express Venus Express and was responsible for most of the camera system of the Giotto mission to Comet Halley. The framing camera on board of the NASA mission Dawn to the asteroid belt was built at the institute.

The institute was leading organization in the development, construction and scientific analysis of the sunrise (telescope). The telescope is solar telescope in the ultraviolet, that hangs from a high-altitude balloon. The five-day maiden flight was conducted in June 2009.

The biggest changes to the institute resulted from German unification with the retraction of two of the four directors of the institute in 1998 and 2004 after the retirement of Hagfors and Rosenbauer. The institute was renamed "Max Planck Institute of Solar System Research" in 2004 after the last director concerned with Ionosphere and Stratosphere research retired. The two remaining groups, of director S. Solanki dedicated to the Sun and heliosphere and of U. Christensen dedicated to planets and comets form the present-day Institute.

Since 2004, the institute has published the open access review journal Living Reviews in Solar Physics.

The Max Planck Society decided to move the institute closer to the University of Göttingen. In 2010, it was planned to relocate it to a new building next to the university's Faculty of Physics by April 2014. The move was completed in February 2014 and the opening ceremony held on 21 May of the same year.

== Directors of the institute ==
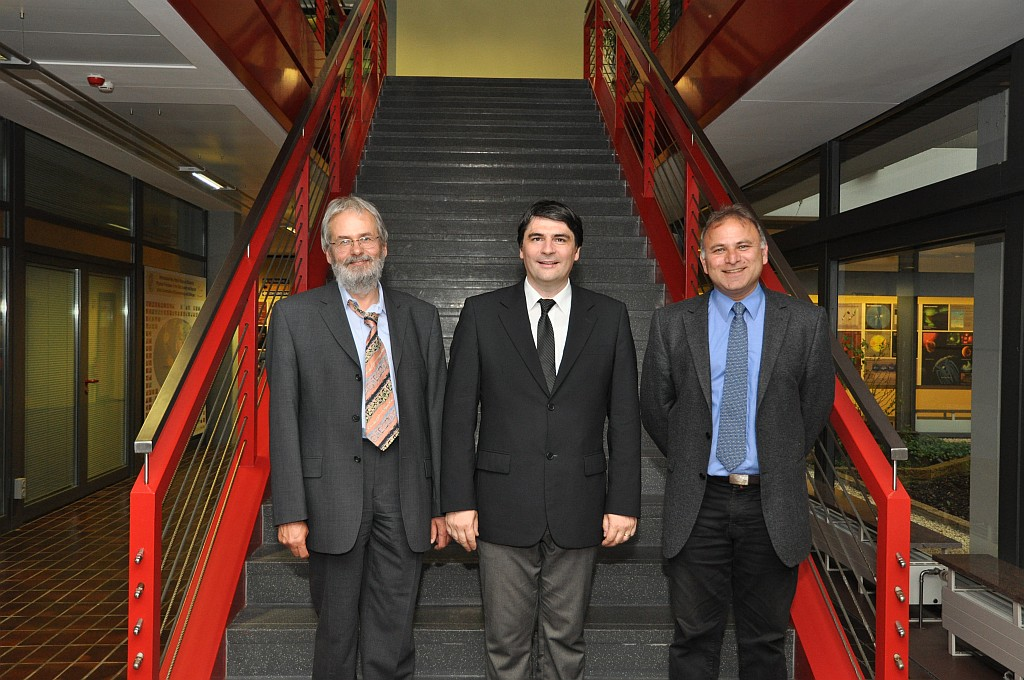
Prof. Ulrich Christensen (left), Prof. Dr. Laurent Gizon (centre) and Prof. Dr. Sami K. Solanki (right)

- 1955–1964 Julius Bartels
- 1951–1975 Walter Dieminger
- 1965–1971 Alfred Ehmert
- 1965–1977 Georg Pfotzer
- 1974–1990 Sir (William) Ian Axford
- 1992–1998 Tor Hagfors
- 1977–2004 Helmut Rosenbauer
- 1977–2007 Vytenis Vasyliunas
- 1999– Sami K. Solanki (Sun and Heliosphere Department)
- 2002–2020 Ulrich R. Christensen (Planets and Comets Department)
- 2011– Laurent Gizon (Solar and Stellar Interiors Department)
- 2021– Thorsten Kleine

== Names of the institute ==
- 1934 Ionosphären-Beobachtungsstation bei der Erprobungsstelle der Luftwaffe (Ionosphere Observation Station at the Test Site of the German Airforce)
- 1942 Zentralstelle für Funkberatung (Centre for Radiocommunication Advice)
- 1946 Fraunhoferinstitut für Hochfrequenzforschung (Fraunhofer Institute for High Frequency Research)
- 1949 Max-Planck-Institut für Ionosphärenforschung (Max Planck Institute for Ionospheric Research)
- 1956 Max-Planck-Institut für Physik der Stratosphäre und der Ionosphäre (Max Planck Institute for Stratosphere and Ionosphere Physics)
- 1957 Max-Planck-Institut für Aeronomie (Max Planck Institute for Aeronomy)
- 2004 Max-Planck-Institut für Sonnensystemforschung (Max Planck Institute for Solar System Research)
