= Grupo de Astronomía y Ciencias del Espacio =

Group of Astronomy and Space Sciences
- Formation: 1990
- Headquarters: Paterna (Valencia), Spain
- Website: GACE

The Grupo de Astronomía y Ciencias del Espacio (Group of Astronomy and Space Sciences, GACE-UV) is an astrophysics research group, part of the Image Processing Laboratory (IPL) in the University of Valencia.

It is located in the Parc Científic in Paterna, Valencia.

== See also ==
- List of astronomical societies
