= Adam Burrows =

American astrophysicist

- Education: Princeton University; Massachusetts Institute of Technology
- Scientific career
- Fields: Astrophysics
- Workplaces: Princeton University

Adam Burrows is a noted professor of astrophysical sciences at Princeton University.

== Education ==
Burrows received his undergraduate degree in physics from Princeton University and his Ph.D. in physics from the Massachusetts Institute of Technology.

== Career ==
Adam Burrows has a wife and one step-daughter and currently lives and the town of Princeton, New Jersey. Burrows's primary research interests are supernova theory, exoplanet and brown dwarf theory, planetary atmospheres, computational astrophysics, and nuclear astrophysics. Well known as a pioneer in the theory of exoplanets, brown dwarfs, and supernovae, he has written numerous fundamental and influential papers and reviews on these subjects during the last ~30 years. He has collaborated with more than 150 co-authors on more than 400 papers and given more than 400 invited talks and colloquia.

He is a past chair of the board on Physics and Astronomy (BPA) of the National Research Council (NRC) of the National Academy of Sciences; was the BPA Liaison to the 2010 Decadal Survey of Astronomy; and has been a consultant for the American Museum of Natural History in New York. He has served on the Committee on Astronomy and Astrophysics (CAA) of the NRC; on the NRC Rare Isotope Science Assessment Committee; on the Subcommittee on the Implementation of the DOE Long-Range Plan for Nuclear Physics; as the chair of the Kavli Institute for Theoretical Physics (KITP) advisory board; as the co-chair of NASA's Universe Subcommittee; as the chair of NASA's Origins Subcommittee; as a co-chair of NASA's Strategic Roadmapping Committee "Search for Earth-like Planets"; as a co-chair of NASA's Origins/SEUS Roadmapping committee; and as a primary author of NASA 2003 Origins Roadmap. Burrows is also the director of the Princeton Planets and Life Certificate Program and is on the board of trustees of the Aspen Center for Physics.

In 2011, Burrows delivered a talk, "Explosive Astrophysics: Supernovae and Gamma Ray Bursts," at the first Starmus Festival in the Canary Islands. The talk was published in the book Starmus: 50 Years of Man in Space.

== Honors and awards ==
Burrows is a fellow of the American Academy of Arts and Sciences, a fellow of the American Association for the Advancement of Science, a fellow of the American Physical Society (1992), and a fellow of the Princeton Center for Theoretical Science (PCTS), the 2010 Beatrice M. Tinsley Centennial Professor, and a former Alfred P. Sloan Fellow.

== Selected papers ==
- Burrows, Adam; Lattimer, James M. (1986). "The birth of neutron stars". The Astrophysical Journal. 307: 178–196. Bibcode:1986ApJ...307..178B. doi:10.1086/164405.
- Burrows, Adam (1987). "The Birth of Neutron Stars and Black Holes". Physics Today. 40 (9): 28–37. Bibcode:1987PhT....40i..28B. doi:10.1063/1.881086.
- Burrows, Adam; Liebert, James (1993). "The science of brown dwarfs". Reviews of Modern Physics. 65 (2): 301–336. Bibcode:1993RvMP...65..301B. doi:10.1103/RevModPhys.65.301.
- Burrows, Adam; Saumon, Didier; Guillot, Tristan; Hubbard, William B.; Lunine, Jonathan I. (1995). "Prospects for detection of extra-solar giant planets bynext-generation telescopes". Nature. 375 (6529): 299–301. arXiv:astro-ph/9506055. Bibcode:1995Natur.375..299B. doi:10.1038/375299a0. S2CID 4278964.
- Burrows, Adam; Hayes, John; Fryxell, Bruce A. (1995). "On the Nature of Core-Collapse Supernova Explosions". The Astrophysical Journal. 450: 830–850. arXiv:astro-ph/9506061. Bibcode:1995ApJ...450..830B. doi:10.1086/176188. S2CID 9465228.
- Guillot, Tristan; Burrows, Adam; Hubbard, William B.; Lunine, Jonathan I.; Saumon, Didier (1996). "Giant Planets at Small Orbital Distances". The Astrophysical Journal. 459 (1): L35–L38. arXiv:astro-ph/9511109. Bibcode:1996ApJ...459L..35G. doi:10.1086/309935. S2CID 118924134.
- Burrows, Adam; Marley, Mark S.; Hubbard, William B.; Lunine, Jonathan I.; Guillot, Tristan; Saumon, Didier; Freedman, Richard; Sudarsky, David; Sharp, Christopher Martin (1997). "A Nongray Theory of Extrasolar Giant Planets and Brown Dwarfs". The Astrophysical Journal. 491 (2): 856–875. arXiv:astro-ph/9705201. Bibcode:1997ApJ...491..856B. doi:10.1086/305002. S2CID 17158494.
- Burrows, Adam; Sharp, Christopher Martin (1999). "Chemical Equilibrium Abundances in Brown Dwarf and Extrasolar Giant Planet Atmospheres". The Astrophysical Journal. 512 (2): 843–863. arXiv:astro-ph/9807055. Bibcode:1999ApJ...512..843B. doi:10.1086/306811. S2CID 15706959.
- Burrows, Adam (2000). "Supernova explosions in the Universe". Nature. 403 (6771): 727–733. Bibcode:2000Natur.403..727B. doi:10.1038/35001501. PMID 10693794. S2CID 15855015.
- Sudarsky, David; Burrows, Adam; Pinto, Philip (2000). "Albedo and Reflection Spectra of Extrasolar Giant Planets". The Astrophysical Journal. 538 (2): 885–903. arXiv:astro-ph/9910504. Bibcode:2000ApJ...538..885S. doi:10.1086/309160. S2CID 1360046.
- Burrows, Adam; Hubbard, William B.; Lunine, Jonathan I.; Liebert, James (2001). "The theory of brown dwarfs and extrasolar giant planets". Reviews of Modern Physics. 73 (3): 719–765. arXiv:astro-ph/0103383. Bibcode:2001RvMP...73..719B. doi:10.1103/RevModPhys.73.719. S2CID 204927572.
- Burrows, Adam; Sudarsky, David; Lunine, Jonathan I. (2003). "Beyond the T Dwarfs: Theoretical Spectra, Colors, and Detectability of the Coolest Brown Dwarfs". The Astrophysical Journal. 596 (1): 587–596. arXiv:astro-ph/0304226. Bibcode:2003ApJ...596..587B. doi:10.1086/377709. S2CID 2650950.
- Burrows, Adam; Sudarsky, David; Hubeny, Ivan (2004). "Spectra and Diagnostics for the Direct Detection of Wide-Separation Extrasolar Giant Planets". The Astrophysical Journal. 609 (1): 407–416. arXiv:astro-ph/0401522. Bibcode:2004ApJ...609..407B. doi:10.1086/420974. S2CID 17841993.
- Sharp, Christopher Martin; Burrows, Adam (2007). "Atomic and Molecular Opacities for Brown Dwarf and Giant Planet Atmospheres". The Astrophysical Journal Supplement Series. 168 (1): 140–166. arXiv:astro-ph/0607211. Bibcode:2007ApJS..168..140S. doi:10.1086/508708. S2CID 10180090.
- Burrows, Adam S. (2010). "2020 visions: Astronomy". Nature. 463 (7277): 26–32. Bibcode:2010Natur.463...26B. doi:10.1038/463026a. PMID 20054379. S2CID 205052164.
- Burrows, Adam (2013). "Perspectives on core-collapse supernova theory". Reviews of Modern Physics. 85 (1): 245–261. arXiv:1210.4921. Bibcode:2013RvMP...85..245B. doi:10.1103/RevModPhys.85.245. S2CID 118049190.
- Burrows, Adam S.; Ostriker, Jeremiah P. (2014). "Astronomical reach of fundamental physics". Proceedings of the National Academy of Sciences. 111 (7): 2409–2416. arXiv:1401.1814. Bibcode:2014PNAS..111.2409B. doi:10.1073/pnas.1318003111. PMC 3932888. PMID 24477692.
- Burrows, Adam S. (2014). "Spectra as windows into exoplanet atmospheres". Proceedings of the National Academy of Sciences. 111 (35): 12601–12609. arXiv:1312.2009. Bibcode:2014PNAS..11112601B. doi:10.1073/pnas.1304208111. PMC 4156714. PMID 24613929.
