= Living Reviews in Relativity =

- Discipline: Physics, astrophysics
- Language: English
- Edited by: Piotr Chrusciel

Publication details
- History: 1998-present
- Publisher: Springer Science+Business Media
- Open access: Yes
- License: Creative Commons
- Impact factor: 40.429 (2020)

Standard abbreviations
- ISO 4: Living Rev. Relativ.

Indexing
- ISSN: 1433-8351
- OCLC no.: 39510385

Links
- Journal homepage

Living Reviews in Relativity is a peer-reviewed open-access scientific journal publishing reviews on relativity in the areas of physics and astrophysics. It was founded by Bernard Schutz and published at the Max Planck Institute for Gravitational Physics from 1998 to 2015. After it was sold by Max Planck Society in June 2015, it is now owned and published by Springer Science+Business Media.

The articles in Living Reviews provide critical reviews of the current state of research in the fields they cover. Articles also offer annotated insights into the key literature and describe other available resources. Living Reviews is unique in maintaining a suite of high-quality reviews, which are kept up-to-date by the authors through regularly adding the latest developments and research findings. This is the meaning of the word "living" in the journal's title.

== See also ==
- List of scientific journals in astronomy
