= Tatsuo Izawa =

Japanese researcher (born 1941)

- 伊澤 達夫
- Born: December 24, 1941 (age 84); Tokyo, Japan
- Education: University of Tokyo
- Awards: SPIE Achievement Award (1980); Imperial Invention Award (1982); Medal with Purple Ribbon (1998); John Tyndall Award (2001); C&C Prize (2007)
- Scientific career
- Fields: Optical engineering Fiber optics Electronic materials
- Workplaces: NTT; NTT Electronics; Tokyo Institute of Technology; Chitose Institute of Science and Technology

Tatsuo Izawa (Japanese: 伊澤 達夫; born December 24, 1941) is a Japanese researcher known for his work on fiber-optic communication.

== Early life and education ==
Izawa was born on December 24, 1941 in Tokyo. During World War II, his family temporarily moved to a rural area of Nagano Prefecture, before returning to Tokyo. He attended Tokyo Metropolitan Nishi High School and entered the University of Tokyo in 1961.

He received a Bachelor of Engineering degree from the University of Tokyo in 1965 and completed a doctorate in electronic engineering there in 1970.

== Career ==
After completing his doctorate in 1970, Izawa joined the Electrical Communication Laboratories of the Nippon Telegraph and Telephone Public Corporation. At the Musashino laboratory, he studied semiconductor lasers dynamics and the use of electromigration to alter the refractive index of glass.

Izawa later began investigating the production of low-loss optical fiber. He spent about a year as a visiting researcher at the University of California, Berkeley, studying metal-insulator structures and infrared detectors. He then returned to NTT and transferred to its Ibaraki laboratory in 1975. Izawa devised the VAD method in 1977.

In 1998, Izawa became president, and chief executive officer of NTT Electronics, an NTT subsidiary that manufactured optical and electronic components. He became a corporate adviser in 2004 and a senior adviser in 2007.

In 2007, Izawa joined the Tokyo Institute of Technology as executive vice president responsible for research and industry collaboration.

Izawa later served as president and chair of the governing board of the Chitose Institute of Science and Technology.

== Honors and awards ==
Izawa received an achievement award from the International Society for Optical Engineering in 1980. In 1982, he received Japan's Imperial Invention Award for his optical-fiber research. He was awarded the Medal with Purple Ribbon by the Japanese government in 1998.

In 2001, Optica and the IEEE Lasers and Electro-Optics Society awarded Izawa the John Tyndall Award for his contributions to optical-fiber technology. He was elected a Fellow of Optica in 2002.

Izawa was elected a foreign member of the United States National Academy of Engineering in 2004. His election citation recognized his invention and refinement of the VAD method for manufacturing optical fiber.

In 2007, Izawa shared the C&C Prize with Robert D. Maurer of Corning and John B. MacChesney of Bell Labs. The NEC C&C Foundation recognized the three engineers for their contributions to the development and manufacture of low-loss optical fiber.
