= Yaegashi =

Yaegashi (written: 八重樫) is a Japanese surname. Notable people with the surname include:

- Akira Yaegashi (八重樫 東, born 1983), Japanese boxer
- James Yaegashi, American actor
- Shigeo Yaegashi (八重樫 茂生, 1933–2011) Japanese footballer
- Takehisa Yaegashi (born 1943), Japanese engineer and designer

== Fictional characters ==
- Shizuku Yaegashi (八重樫雫), a character in the light novel series Arifureta: From Commonplace to World's Strongest
- Taichi Yaegashi (八重樫 太一), a character in the light novel series Kokoro Connect
