= James J. Coleman =

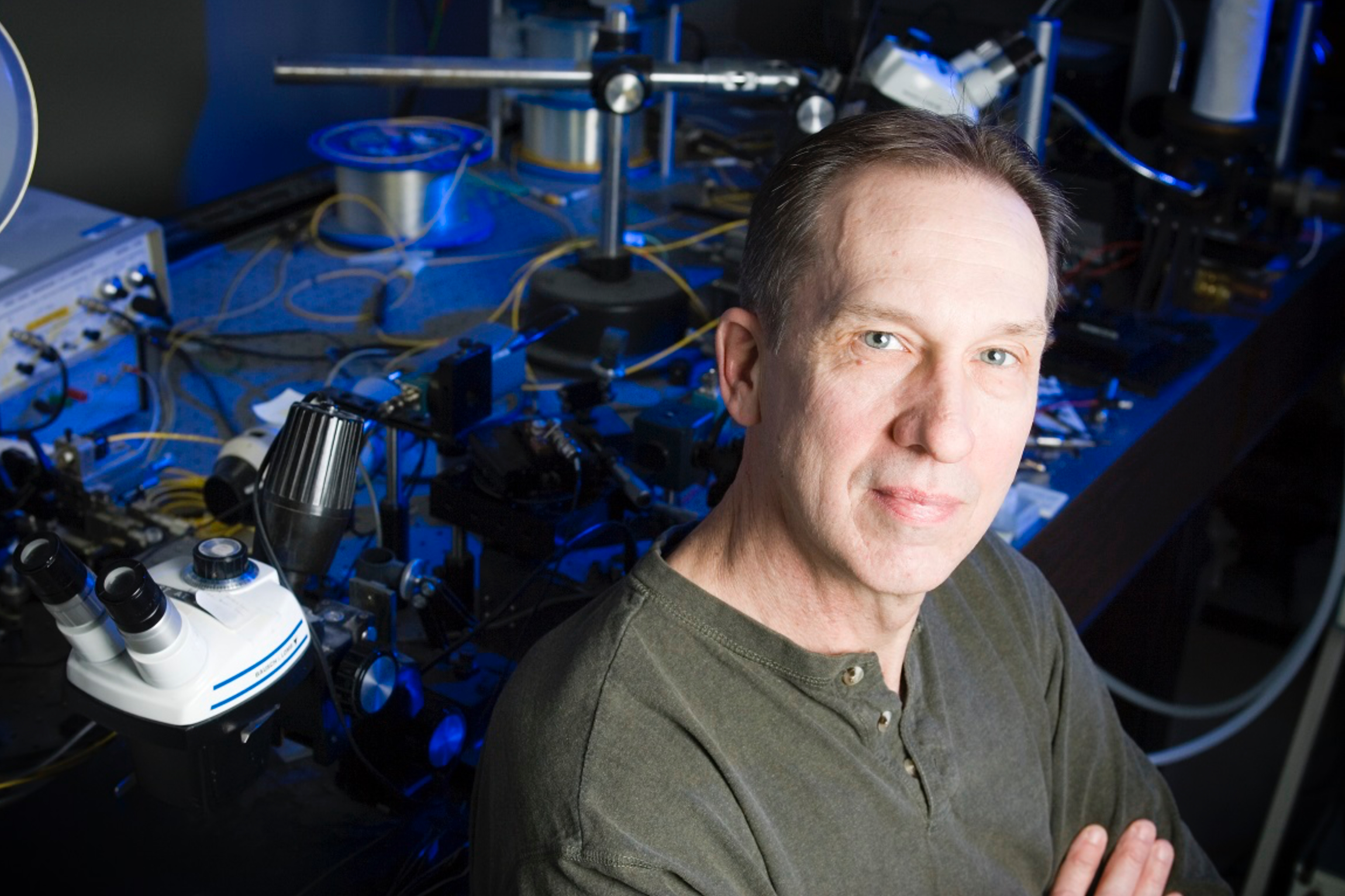
- Born: May 15, 1950 (age 76); Chicago, Illinois, US
- Education: University of Illinois Urbana-Champaign
- Known for: Strained-layer quantum well lasers MOCVD epitaxy
- Awards: IEEE Jun-ichi Nishizawa Medal (2021); John Tyndall Award (2013)
- Scientific career
- Fields: Electrical engineering Physics
- Workplaces: Bell Labs; Rockwell International; University of Illinois Urbana-Champaign
- Doctoral advisor: Nick Holonyak

James J. Coleman (born May 15, 1950 in Chicago, Illinois) is an electrical engineer who worked at Bell Labs, Rockwell International, and the University of Illinois at Urbana–Champaign. He is best known for his work on semiconductor lasers, materials and devices including strained-layer indium gallium arsenide lasers and selective area epitaxy. Coleman is a fellow of the IEEE and a member of the US National Academy of Engineering.

== Early life and education ==
James J. Coleman was born in the Garfield Ridge neighborhood of Chicago, Illinois. He was the eldest son of Harry A. Coleman and Lorita M. Kelly. He attended St. Daniel the Prophet Elementary School and St. Laurence High School.

Coleman received BS (1972), MS (1973), and PhD (1975) degrees in Electrical Engineering from the University of Illinois at Urbana–Champaign. He stayed on at Illinois, and was granted an MSEE in 1973 under the direction of O.L. Gaddy. Continuing at Illinois, Coleman did his PhD research under the direction of Nick Holonyak, writing a thesis on room temperature visible semiconductor diode lasers. He received his PhD from Illinois in 1975.

== Career ==
Coleman joined AT&T Bell Laboratories (Murray Hill, New Jersey) in 1976, where his initial assignment was in the Materials Science Research Department under the direction of Morton B. Panish. His work there involved contributions to the development of 1.3 μm InGaAsP CW room temperature diode telecommunications lasers grown by liquid phase epitaxy.

In 1978, he went to Rockwell International (Anaheim, California) to work with Daniel Dapkus on metalorganic chemical vapor deposition (MOCVD), which has become a major process in the manufacture of compound semiconductor devices. They made use of this process to study MOCVD-grown heteroface AlGaAs solar cells, low-threshold single mode AlGaAs-GaAs double heterostructure lasers and quantum well heterostructure laser devices.

In 1982, Coleman returned to the University of Illinois Urbana-Champaign, as associate professor, and was promoted to professor in 1984. He was professor of Electrical and Computer Engineering. He was named the Franklin W. Woeltge Professor of Electrical and Computer Engineering (2002) and the Intel Alumni Endowed Chair in Electrical and Computer Engineering (2003).

He and his students were the first group to define experimentally the ranges of wavelength, threshold current density, and reliability of 980 nm strained-layer InGaAs lasers. They reported high performance narrow linewidth DBR lasers, integrated lasers and other photonic devices by selective-area epitaxy, and detailed the growth processes for patterned quantum dot lasers.

Coleman directed more than 29 PhD thesis students at Illinois, most of who took their first jobs in industry. He was named to the List of Teachers Ranked as Excellent twelve times. He is presently the Intel Alumni Endowed Chair Emeritus in Electrical and Computer Engineering.

From 2013-2023, he held positions at the University of Texas, Dallas and the University of Texas, Arlington.

Coleman has had significant involvement in the publications, conference, and leadership activities of the major professional societies associated with the field of photonics (IEEE, OSA, SPIE, APS, and AAAS). He has served the IEEE Photonics Society (formerly the IEEE Lasers and Electro-Optics Society) as an associate editor of IEEE Photonics Technology Letters (nine years), a Distinguished Lecturer, an elected member of the board of governors, and vice-president for publications. He completed a five-year commitment to the leadership of the society, having served as president-elect, president, and past president. The society awarded him the Distinguished Service Award in 2008.

== Research ==
Coleman studies epitaxial growth and processing of semiconductor materials and devices, especially liquid phase epitaxy, metalorganic chemical vapor deposition (MOCVD and strained-layer quantum well heterostructures. His primary interest is semiconductor diode lasers, including quantum well, quantum dot, and strained layer lasers, as well as integrated photonic devices.

He has published more than 400 scientific papers, and holds 10 U.S. patents.

== Honors ==
- William Streifer Scientific Achievement Award, IEEE Lasers and Electro-Optics Society (2000)"for pioneering research in high reliability strained layer semiconductor lasers"
- ISCS Heinrich Welker Award (2004) "for the demonstration of reliable strained layer lasers leading to 980 nm Er fiber pumps"
- Nick Holonyak, Jr. Award, Optical Society of America (2006) "for a career of contributions to quantum well and strained-layer semiconductor lasers through innovative epitaxial growth methods and novel device designs"
- IEEE David Sarnoff Award (2008) "for leadership in the development of highly reliable strained-layer lasers"
- SPIE Technical Achievement Award (2011) "for contributions to the methods, designs, and demonstrations of selectivity grown discrete and monolithically integrated compound semiconductor lasers and photonic devices"
- Member, National Academy of Engineering (2012) for contributions to semiconductor lasers and photonic materials
- John Tyndall Award, IEEE Photonics Society and Optical Society of America (2013)
- Fellow, National Academy of Inventors (2014)
- John Bardeen Award, Minerals, Metals & Materials Society (2020)
- IEEE Jun-ichi Nishizawa Medal (2021)
