= Suematsu =

Suematsu (written: 末松) is a Japanese surname. Notable people with the surname include:

- Shinsuke Suematsu (末松 信介, born 1955), Japanese politician
- Suematsu Kenchō (末松 謙澄, 1855–1920), Japanese politician and writer
- Yasuharu Suematsu (末松 安晴, born 1932), Japanese scientist
- Yoshinori Suematsu (末松 義規, born 1956), Japanese politician
