= Society for Information Display =

American professional association

The Society for Information Display (SID) is an industry organization for displays, generally electronic displays such as televisions and computer monitors. SID was founded in September 1962. Its main activities are publishing technical journals and running "Display Week", its main conference, held in May or June each year. SID publications include the Journal of the Society for Information Display, published monthly, the Digest of Technical Papers from SID's annual conference, Information Display magazine, proceedings from other conferences such as the Vehicle Displays and Interfaces Symposium, Asia Display, and International Display Workshops. In addition, local chapters in the Americas, Europe, and throughout Asia have meetings frequently, including lectures by display technologists, and are sometimes offered as webcasts. The SID Board of Directors grants several SID awards based upon outstanding achievements and significant contributions.

== History ==
In early 1960s, the Institute of Radio Engineers (IRE) declined to create a new section devoted solely to electronic information displays. This caused founders from the IRE to start their own society, the Society for Information Display (SID).

SID was founded when Dr. Luxenberg held a meeting on September 29, 1962 at UCLA in Boelter Hall. There were 39 initial attendees. One of the founding members of SID was Edith M. Bairdain. The organization was made up of professionals interested in information display and the interactions between humans and machines. The annual SID symposium, seminar and exhibition is known as "Display Week."

Due to emergence of new display technologies and their successful commercialization, such as cathode-ray tube (CRT), plasma display, liquid-crystal display (LCD) and OLED displays, SID has expanded its scale in membership as well as the attendance in Display Week, its symposium and exhibition.

In 2020, because of the COVID-19 pandemic, SID Display Week was held for the first time online. The event drew more than 5,500 attendees from 50+ countries and Takatoshi Tsujimura was named SID president.

== Awards ==
=== Karl Ferdinand Braun Prize ===
The Karl Ferdinand Braun Prize is awarded "for an outstanding technical achievement in, or contribution to, display technology." The Prize is named after German physicist Karl Ferdinand Braun, the inventor of the cathode-ray tube.

List of recipients:

- 1987 – T. Peter Brody
- 1988 – Toshio Inoguchi
- 1989 – Norman F. Fyler, Harold B. Law, Edward Ramberg, and Alfred C. Schroeder
- 1990 – Akio Ohkoshi
- 1991 – Kentaro Kiyozumi and Tadashi Nakamura
- 1992 – Martin Schadt
- 1993 – William E. Glenn, William E. Good, and Thomas T. True
- 1995 – Eiichi Yamazaki
- 1996 – George Gray
- 1997 – Isamu Washizuka
- 1998 – Cyril Hilsum
- 1999 – Larry Hornbeck
- 2000 – Larry F. Weber
- 2003 – Tsutae Shinoda
- 2004 – Shuji Nakamura
- 2005 – William P. Bleha
- 2006 – Christopher N. King
- 2008 – Richard Williams
- 2009 – Frederic J. Kahn
- 2011 – Rudolf Eidenschink
- 2012 – Jun Souk
- 2013 – Isamu Akasaki
- 2014 – Katsumi Kondo
- 2015 – Junji Kido
- 2016 – Ho Kyoon Chung
- 2017 – Hiroyuki Ohshima
- 2018 – Hidefumi Yoshida
- 2019 – Amal Ghosh
- 2020 – Julie Brown
- 2021 – Sungchul Kim
- 2022 – Wei Chen and John Zhong
- 2023 – Hideo Hosono, Toshio Kamiya, and Kenji Nomura
- 2024 – Ching Tang and Steven Van Slyke
- 2025 – Xiaolin Yan
