= IEEE Lotfi A. Zadeh Award for Emerging Technologies =

- Awarded for: Outstanding contributions to emerging technologies recognized within recent years
- Presented by: Institute of Electrical and Electronics Engineers
- First award: 2000
- Website: IEEE Lotfi A. Zadeh Award for Emerging Technologies

The IEEE Lotfi A. Zadeh Award for Emerging Technologies (until 2020 called the IEEE Daniel E. Noble Award) is a Technical Field Award of the IEEE for contributions to emerging technologies. The award is named after the US-Azerbaijani mathematician Lotfi A. Zadeh. The award was established by the IEEE Board of Directors in 2000, replacing the prior IEEE Morris N. Liebmann Memorial Award.

The award may be presented to an individual or a team of up to three people.

Recipients receive a bronze medal, certificate and honorarium.

== Recipients ==
Recipients of the award include:

- 2027: Peng Shi
- 2026: Chin-Teng Lin
- 2025: Dimitar P. Filev
- 2024: Andras Kis
- 2021–2023: No award
- 2020: Miro Micovic
- 2019: Thomas Kenny
- 2018: Rajiv Joshi
- 2017: Miguel A. L. Nicolelis (Brazil)
- 2016: Mark G. Allen (USA)
- 2015: Khalil Najafi
- 2014: Gabriel M. Rebeiz
- 2013: Jan P. Allebach
- 2012: Subramanian S. Iyer
- 2011: Mark L. Burgener
- 2011: Ronald E. Reedy (USA)
- 2010: Shinichi Abe
- 2010: Shoichi Sasaki
- 2010: Takehisa Yaegashi (Japan)
- 2009: Larry F. Weber (USA)
- 2008: James M. Daughton
- 2008: Stuart Parkin (UK)
- 2008: Saied Tehrani
- 2007: Stephen R. Forrest
- 2007: Richard H. Friend
- 2007: Ching W. Tang (USA)
- 2006: Carlos A. Paz de Araujo (Brazil)
- 2005: David L. Harame
- 2004: Larry J. Hornbeck
- 2003: Kenichi Iga
- 2002: Masataka Nakazawa
- 2001: Katsutoshi Izumi
- 2000 and earlier: See IEEE Morris N. Liebmann Memorial Award
