= Donald Keck =

American physicist (born 1941)

Donald B. Keck
- Born: January 2, 1941 (age 85); Lansing, Michigan, U.S.
- Education: Michigan State University
- Awards: John Tyndall Award (1992); National Medal of Technology (2000)
- Scientific career
- Fields: Physics, optical physics, optical fiber, fiber sensors, guided wave devices
- Workplaces: Corning, Inc.

Donald B. Keck (born January 2, 1941) is an American research physicist and engineer most noted for his involvement in developing low-loss optical fiber. Keck grew up in Lansing, Michigan and attended Michigan State University, after which he joined Corning Incorporated’s research department. As a senior research scientist for Corning, Keck, along with Robert D. Maurer and Peter C. Schultz, designed the first optical fiber with optical losses low enough for wide use in telecommunications.

Keck spent his professional career at Corning, Inc., where he eventually held the position of Vice President and Technology Director of Optical Physics, during which time he guided the company into the field of photonics. For his work with optical fiber, he was inducted into the National Inventors Hall of Fame in 1993 and received the prestigious National Medal of Technology in 2000.

== Early life ==
Keck was born and raised in Lansing, Michigan. He entered Michigan State University in 1958 with the intention of becoming an electrical engineer. During his undergraduate years, he was persuaded by his father to switch disciplines and study physics. As a result, he received his B.S. in physics in 1962 and his M.S. in physics in 1964, both from Michigan State. He subsequently continued his studies, writing his doctorate thesis on infrared spectroscopy, and ultimately received his Ph.D. in physics from Michigan State in 1967.

After receiving his Ph.D., Keck accepted an offer from Corning, moved to New York, and began work as a senior research scientist on the project in January 1968.

== Career ==
Instead of trying to improve upon existing fibers by using better raw materials, Corning's Optical WaveGuide Project team sought to explore the capabilities of new materials, including pure silica.

They started work on the project as soon as Keck arrived at the beginning of 1968. They experimented with different glass compositions and methods of heating the glass. In August 1970, Keck took measurements of the newest batch of fibers he had heat-treated. When Keck noticed the light passed through the 65 foot fiber seemingly without any loss, he exclaimed "Good grief, what do I have here?" Keck took more measurements of the fiber, and discovered it had an attenuation of 16 db/km, exceeding the goal of 20 db/km. Upon this discovery, Keck wrote in his laboratory notebook, "Attenuation equals 17 db it says. Eureka," followed by an exclamatory "Whoopee!". Keck and his team had invented the first low-loss optical fiber; it was composed of heat-treated titanium-doped silica. Papers were written and patents were filed.

In the meantime, Keck continued to improve upon the fiber he had invented. He replaced the titanium oxide glass of 1970 with germanium oxide doped glass, and eventually achieved a consistent 4 db/km attenuation in June 1972. By the end of the 1970s, Keck had four critical inventions which secured Corning's place as frontrunner in the optical fiber revolution: fused silica doped with titanium; fused silica doped with germanium; the inside vapor deposition, or IV process, for making fiber; and the outside vapor deposition, or OV process, for making fiber, which would ultimately become the leading manufacturing method.

By 1979, Corning was mass-producing the refined optical fiber invented by Keck in Wilmington, North Carolina.

He was elected editor-in-chief of Journal of Lightwave Technology in 1989, a position he held until 1994. After beginning as a senior research scientist in 1968, almost 30 years later, in April 1997, Corning appointed Keck the division vice president of core technology, optics and photonics – science and technology.

Keck retired from Corning in 2002. At the time of his retirement he held the position of vice president and director of research. Immediately after his retirement, Keck helped establish the Infotonics Technology Center in Canandaigua (town), New York, a collaborative organization between private industry and government focused on photonics and nanotechnology innovation. Due to his expertise in both photonics and research management, he was elected the first chief technology officer of Infotonics, a position he held briefly.

== Personal ==
Keck and his wife Ruth currently reside in Big Flats, New York, outside of Corning. He has two adult children, both of whom are also involved in technological fields: Lynne Vaia, a civil engineer, and Brian Keck, a software expert. He is involved in local philanthropy in Corning, holding board membership for the American Red Cross, the Community Foundation, and the Science Center. In addition to still consulting for Infotonics, Keck remains active in the science community, serving on the oversight board for the National Institute of Standards and Technology, the IPO Education Foundation Board of Directors, as well as holding the position of vice-chair of the National Inventors Hall of Fame Board of Directors. Furthermore, Keck is a benefactor of his alma mater, Michigan State University, where he also currently sits on the advisory board for the university's College of Natural Science, of which he was a graduate.

== Awards and honors ==
Keck's alma mater, Michigan State University, named him a Distinguished Alumnus, and Rensselaer Polytechnic Institute granted him an honorary degree in 2004. In 1992, he received the John Tyndall Award from The Optical Society and IEEE Photonics Society. The Optical Society has also elected him a Fellow in 1972 and Honorary Member in 2012, the Society's most distinguished of all member categories. For his discovery of low-loss optical fiber in particular, Keck was inducted into the National Inventors Hall of Fame in 1993, after which he served as President of the National Inventors Hall of Fame Foundation. Also in 1993, Keck was elected a member of the National Academy of Engineering for invention and development of manufacturing methods of low-attenuation glass fibers for optical communication.

He is also a recipient of the Department of Commerce American Innovator Award and the SPIE Technology Achievement Award. For his work with photonics, Keck was honored with Laurin Publishing's Distinction in Photonics Award in 2002.

In 2000, U.S. President Bill Clinton awarded Keck, along with his fellow Corning researchers Maurer and Schultz, the nation's highest honor for innovators, the National Medal of Technology. Their award citation read: "Their invention has enabled the telecommunications revolution, rapidly transformed our society, the way we work, learn and live – and our expectations for the future. It is the basis for one of the largest, most dynamic industries in the world today."

== Patents ==
Keck acquired 36 U.S. patents and authored more than 150 papers in the areas of optical fibers and fiber components. Selected patents are listed below:

- U.S. patent 3,659,915 (1972-05) Maurer, et al., "Fused Silica Optical Waveguide."
- U.S. patent 3,711,262 (1973-01) Keck, et al., "IV Method of producing optical waveguide fibers."
