= Takanori =

- Gender: Male

Origin
- Origin: Japanese
- Meaning: Different meanings depending on the kanji used

Takanori (written: 貴教, 貴紀, 貴徳, 貴則, 孝敬, 孝紀, 孝徳, 孝典, 孝憲, 孝法, 孝則, 隆典, 隆則, 陽功, 聖典, 雅男, 崇典 or 鎬則) is a masculine Japanese given name. Notable people with the name include:

- Takanori An'yōji (安用寺 孝功; born 1974), Japanese shogi player
- Takanori Arisawa (有澤 孝紀; 1951–2005), Japanese composer and arranger
- Takanori Chiaki (千明 聖典; born 1987), Japanese footballer
- Takanori Fukushima (福島 孝徳; born 1942), Japanese neurosurgeon
- Takanori Gomi (五味 隆典; born 1978), Japanese mixed martial artist
- Takanori Hashimoto (橋本 崇載; born 1983), Japanese shogi player
- Takanori Hatakeyama (畑山 隆則; born 1975), Japanese boxer
- Takanori Hoshino (星野 貴紀; born 1980), Japanese voice actor
- Takanori Ito (伊藤 貴則; born 1993), Japanese professional wrestler
- Takanori Jinnai (陣内 孝則; born 1958), Japanese actor, film director and singer
- Takanori Kawai (川合 孝典; born 1964), Japanese politician
- Takanori Kono (河野 孝典; born 1969), Japanese Nordic combined skier
- Takanori Maeno (前野 貴徳; born 1988), Japanese footballer
- Takanori Nakajima (中島 崇典; born 1984), Japanese footballer
- Takanori Nishikawa (西川 貴教; born 1970), Japanese singer and actor
- Takanori Nunobe (布部 陽功; born 1973), Japanese footballer
- Takanori Okoshi (大越 孝敬; born 1932), Japanese electrical engineer and composer
- Takanori Ōyama (大山 鎬則; born 1974), Japanese voice actor and actor
- Takanori Sugeno (菅野 孝憲; born 1984), Japanese footballer
- Takanori Sugibayashi (杉林 孝法; born 1976), Japanese triple jumper
- Takanori Tochiakagi (栃赤城 雅男; 1954–1997), Japanese sumo wrestler
