= Kogelnik =

Kogelnik is a surname. Notable people with the surname include:

- Herwig Kogelnik (born 1932), Austrian-American electrical and optical engineer
- Kiki Kogelnik (1935–1997), Austrian-American painter, sculptor and printmaker
