= Kazurō =

- Gender: Male

Origin
- Origin: Japanese
- Meaning: Different meanings depending on the kanji used

Kazurō, Kazuro or Kazurou (written: 和郎) is a masculine Japanese given name. Notable people with the name include:

- Kazurou Inoue (井上 和郎) (born 1972), Japanese manga artist
- Kazuro Kikuchi, Japanese electrical engineering professor
- Kazuro Morita (森田 和郎) (1955–2012), Japanese video game designer
- Kazuro Watanabe (渡辺 和郎) (born 1955), Japanese astronomer
