= T. Peter Brody =

Hungarian-British physicist (1920–2011)

Tamas Peter Brody
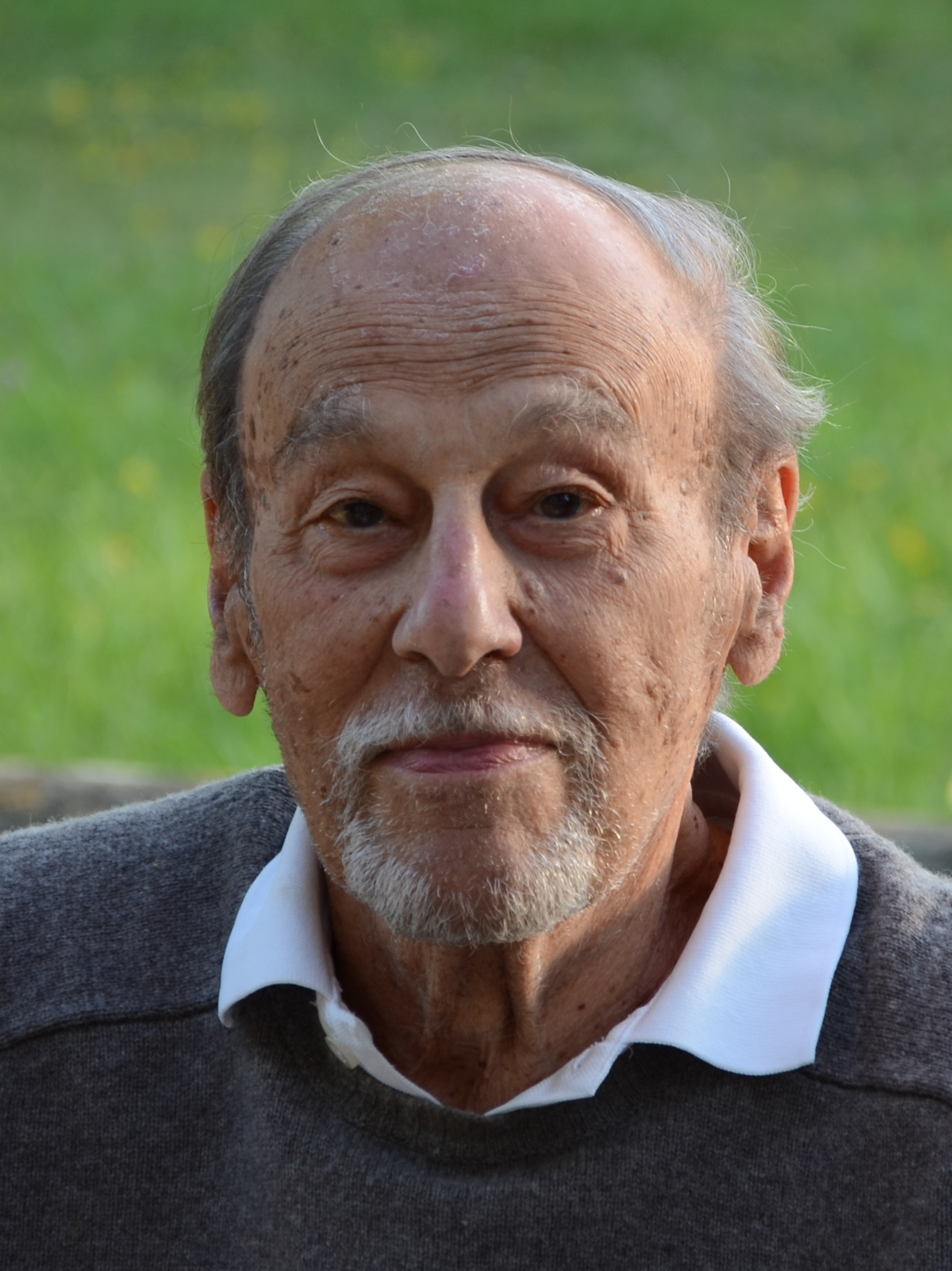
- T. Peter Brody in 2011
- Born: Bródy Tamás Péter; 18 April 1920; Budapest, Hungary
- Died: 18 September 2011 (aged 91); Pittsburgh, Pennsylvania, United States
- Occupations: Founder and chief scientist, Advantech US
- Known for: Inventing the Active matrix display

Tamas Peter Brody (18 April 1920 – 18 September 2011) was a British-naturalised physicist and the co-inventor of active matrix thin-film transistor display technology together with Fang-Chen Luo, having produced the world's first active-matrix liquid-crystal display (AM-LCD) in 1972 and the first functional AM-EL (electroluminescent display) in 1973 while employed by Westinghouse Electric Corporation in Pittsburgh. Brody coined the term "active matrix" and first used it in a published journal article in 1975.

== Early life and career ==
Brody was born in Budapest, Hungary. From early childhood Brody was interested in sports, particularly swimming and rowing, and had a passion for classical music. In 1938 he left his parents and two younger brothers behind in Hungary to learn the family trade at the London College of Printing. He was naturalised as a British subject in January 1948. He served as a designer/draftsman and worked for the Special Operations Executive in the British Army during and after the Second World War, rising to the rank of staff captain.

Brody studied piano at the Guildhall School of Music and Drama in London winning the Lady Mayoress' Prize for piano performance in 1952. Brody met his future wife Maude M. Frost at a Fabian Society dance in London and they married in 1952.

Brody obtained a Ph.D. in Theoretical Physics from the University of London in 1953 and worked as a senior lecturer at the university until 1959. He moved to Pittsburgh, Pennsylvania, on being offered the opportunity to work as a researcher for Westinghouse Electric Corporation.

From 1959 to 1979 he did theoretical work on tunnel diodes, semiconductor device theory and experiment, injection luminescence, field emission, pattern recognition, later turning his interest to thin film technology.

Brody died in Pittsburgh, aged 91.

== Thin-film transistors ==
The cathode ray tube, like the brontosaurus, will become extinct, and for the same reason: too much bulk, very little brain.

— T. P. Brody, 1979

Over the years 1968–79, Brody developed many electronic uses for thin-film transistors, including flexible circuits, aircraft power controls, industrial timers and others. His work at Westinghouse culminated in the invention of active matrix technology, using a CdSe TFT to drive each individual pixel of a flat-panel display. This form of liquid-crystal display is the dominant technology in flat-panel displays.

When Westinghouse cancelled the research program in 1979, Brody resigned, and two years later founded Panelvision Corporation, the world's first AM-LCD company. In 1983 the company introduced the first AM-LCD products into the US market. Panelvision was acquired by Litton Systems in 1985, and after a period of consulting, Dr. Brody founded Magnascreen Corporation, oriented towards very large area displays, in 1988. This venture was funded in part by Jerome Wiesner, Richard Leghorn of Itek, and Apple's John Sculley, and won contracts worth $7.8 million from the Defense Advanced Research Projects Agency (DARPA).

Brody left Magnascreen in 1990 to form Active Matrix Associates, a consulting group, and over the period 1991–97 worked on a number of classified projects for DARPA. In 1998, in collaboration with two former Westinghouse colleagues, Bob Stapleton and Paul Malmberg, he invented a process for fabricating low-cost thin film electronic circuits by purely additive processes. In 2002 he founded Amedeo Corporation (now Advantech US), funded in part by Compaq, dedicated to the exploitation of additive technology. The company is concentrating on the development and commercial production of low cost active matrix backplanes for emerging display technologies, including AM-OLED. He was active as chief scientist of Advantech US until his death at the age of 91.

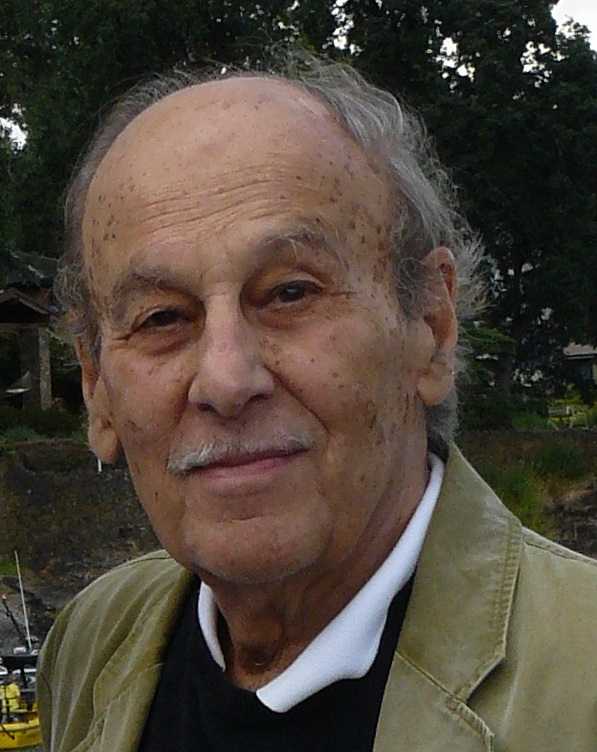
Brody in 2008

Brody was a fellow of the Society for Information Display (SID), and a recipient of many awards in recognition of his pioneering work, which became the foundation of a major new industry. He published over 70 scientific papers and received more than 60 patents. The SID created the Peter Brody Prize in 2017 to honor outstanding contributions of young researchers to active matrix information display technology.

== Awards and honors ==
- 1976 – Society for Information Display (SID) Special Recognition Award
- 1983 – SID Fellowship
- 1987 – SID Karl Ferdinand Braun Prize
- 1988 – Rank Prize in Optoelectronics (UK)
- 1988 – Eduard Rhein Prize (Germany)
- 2011 – IEEE Jun-ichi Nishizawa Medal
- 2012 – Charles Stark Draper Prize

Brody was the first person in history to receive all three major SID awards.
