= Henry Kressel =

American engineer, scientist, and financial executive

- Education: Yeshiva College Harvard University University of Pennsylvania
- Awards: 1974 IEEE Fellow 1984 IEEE Centennial Medal; 1985 IEEE David Sarnoff Award; American Physical Society Fellow National Academy of Engineering Member
- Scientific career
- Workplaces: RCA Laboratories; Warburg Pincus

Henry Kressel (born c. 1934) is an American engineer, scientist, and financial executive.

In 1980, Kressel was elected a member of the National Academy of Engineering for pioneering research in opto-electronic devices with specific emphasis on semiconductor lasers.

He is a partner and the senior managing director of the private equity firm Warburg Pincus.

He has been a board member of SRI International since 2001.

== Early life and education ==
Kressel's parents and sister were murdered in The Holocaust during World War II, after which Kressel emigrated to the United States. He entered Chaim Berlin High School in 1947 and graduated in 1951.

Kressel earned a bachelor's degree in physics from Yeshiva College, a master's in applied physics from Harvard University, an MBA from The Wharton School at the University of Pennsylvania and a Ph.D. in material science, also from the University of Pennsylvania.

== Career ==
Kressel joined RCA Laboratories in 1959, and spent 23 years there. He was in charge of development and commercialization of research developments in a variety of fields including light sources, light detectors, and integrated circuits. The development of the first practical laser diodes and the first epitaxial silicon solar cell are also attributed to him. He eventually became vice president of solid-state electronic research and development.

Kressel joined Warburg Pincus in 1983.

== Memberships and awards ==
Kressel received an honorary doctorate from Yeshiva University. He is a 1974 IEEE Fellow and was the founding president of IEEE Lasers and Electro-Optics Society in 1977. He received the IEEE Centennial Medal in 1984 and the IEEE David Sarnoff Award in 1985 for "contributions to electronic devices". He was elected to the National Academy of Engineering in 1980 and is a Fellow of the American Physical Society.

He is on the board of directors of SRI International, Aicent, EnStorage, MACH, Suniva and Telcordia Technologies. He has been on the board of directors of Yeshiva University's Sy Syms School of Business since 2004, and is the chairman of the board of trustees of Yeshiva University.

In 2008, Kressel created a scholarship at Yeshiva University in his own name, the Henry Kressel Research Scholarship.

== Patents and publications ==
Kressel holds 33 United States patents and has published more than 120 papers. He has also published six books:

- Characterization of Epitaxial Semiconductor Films (Methods and Phenomena: Their Applications in Science and Technology, Vol. 2). Elsevier. 1976-04-01. ISBN 0-444-41438-X.
- Semiconductor Lasers and Heterojunction LEDS. Academic Press. 1977. ISBN 0-12-426250-3.
- Competing for the Future: How Digital Innovations are Changing the World. Cambridge University Press. 2007. ISBN 978-0-521-86290-5.
- Investing in Dynamic Markets: Venture Capital in the Digital Age. Cambridge University Press. July 2010. ISBN 978-0-521-11148-5.
- Entrepreneurship in the Global Economy: Engine for Economic Growth. Cambridge University Press. August 2012. ISBN 978-1-107-01976-8.
- If You Really Want to Change the World: A Guide to Creating, Building, and Sustaining Breakthrough Ventures. Harvard Business Review. October 2015. ISBN 978-1-625-27829-6.
