= Masataka Nakazawa =

Japanese electrical engineer

- 中沢正隆
- Born: 17 September 1952 (age 73); Yamanashi, Japan
- Citizenship: Japan
- Education: Kanazawa University; Tokyo Institute of Technology
- Known for: Erbium-doped fiber amplifier (EDFA); Backward Raman amplification Quadrature amplitude modulation
- Awards: IEEE Daniel E. Noble Award (2002); R. W. Wood Prize (2005); Japan Academy Prize (2013); Japan Prize (2023)
- Scientific career
- Fields: Electronics engineering
- Workplaces: Tohoku University; Massachusetts Institute of Technology; Nippon Telegraph & Telephone Public Corporation

Masataka Nakazawa (born 17 September 1952) is a Japanese researcher in optical communication engineering. He is a distinguished professor at Tohoku University in Japan. His pioneering work on erbium-doped fiber amplifier (EDFA) has made a significant contribution to the development of global long-distance, high-capacity optical fiber network.

== Biography ==
Masataka Nakazawa received B.S. in Electronics from Kanazawa University in 1975, M.S. in Physical Electronics from Tokyo Institute of Technology in 1977, and Ph.D. in Applied Electronics from Tokyo Institute of Technology in 1980. After receiving a Ph. D. degree, he joined the Electrical Communication Laboratory of Nippon Telegraph & Telephone Public Corporation in 1980. He was a visiting scientist at Massachusetts Institute of Technology in 1984. In 1999, he became an NTT R&D Fellow. Then, in 2001, he moved to the Research Institute of Electrical Communication (RIEC) at Tohoku University. He became a distinguished professor (DP) in 2008 and the director of RIEC in 2010. He also served as the director of Japan Council for Research Institutes and Centers of National Universities and of Research Organization of Electrical Communication (ROEC) in 2011. Currently, he is a director of Kanazawa University (part time) and a specially appointed professor/ distinguished professor at the International Research Institute of Disaster Science at Tohoku University

== Research ==
He introduced erbium ions into optical communication in 1984, when he constructed the first erbium (Er^{3+}): glass laser operating at 1.55 μm, and then used it as an optical time domain reflectometer (OTDR). This enabled a fault to be located in a 130 km-long single-mode fiber, which remains the world record distance. He then began research on an erbium-doped fiber laser in 1987 and amplifier in 1989. After Dr. R. J. Mears of Prof. Payne’s group reported the first EDFA in 1987, Dr. Nakazawa used a 1.48 μm InGaAsP laser diode (LD) to pump the erbium fiber and reported the highest gain of 46.5 dB in 1989 after employing the LD for Raman amplification at 1.55 μm in 1988. He invented the LD pumped erbium-doped fiber amplifier (EDFA), which made it possible to construct a compact, reliable, and low-power consumption optical repeater for high-speed, high-capacity, and long-distance optical communication systems. He also reported backward Raman amplification in 1984, which remains in commercial use.

He subsequently undertook intensive work on high-speed optical transmission technology using ultrashort Gaussian pulses, optical solitons, optical Fourier transformation, and Nyquist pulses. Nakazawa’s work spans diverse areas of photonics including optical communication, various fiber lasers, and quadrature amplitude modulation (QAM) coherent transmission with the highest multiplicity of 4096. Recently, he has been concentrating on Mode locking technology for the generation of various optical pulses and a QAM quantum noise stream cipher with continuous variable quantum key distribution (QKD).

He has published more than 500 academic journal papers and given 400 international conference presentations. During his 40-year career he has received 5 paper awards and three centennial milestone certificates of commendation from the Institute of Electronics, Information, and Communication Engineers (IEICE).

== Professional society membership ==
He is a Fellow and Honorary Member of the Institute of Electronics, Information, and Communication Engineers (IEICE), a Fellow of the Japan Society of Applied Physics (JSAP), a Life Fellow of IEEE, and a Fellow Emeritus, OPTICA (formerly OSA). He also served as a Director at Large of the Optical Society of America (OSA) in 2007, on the Board of Governors of the IEEE Photonics Society in 2013, and as the President of IEICE in 2019

== Awards and honors ==
- 1989 - Sakurai Kenjiro Memorial Award
- 1992 - OSA Fellow
- 1994 - IEICE Achievement Award
- 1995 - IEEE Fellow
- 2002 - IEEE Daniel E. Noble Award
- 2002 - Inoue Harushige Award from Japan Science and Technology Agency
- 2003 - Ichimura Industrial Award from Research Development Corporation of Japan
- 2005 - OSA Robert W. Wood Prize
- 2006 - Thomson Reuters Citation Laureates
- 2009 - Japan’s Prime Minister’s Award for Industry-Academia-Government Collaboration Meritorious Achievement
- 2010 - IEEE Quantum Electronics Award
- 2013 - Japan Academy Prize
- 2013 - C&C Prize
- 2014 - OSA Charles H. Townes Award
- 2023 - Japan Prize
- 2024 - Asian Scientist 100, Asian Scientist
