= Masayoshi Esashi =

Japanese engineer

Masayoshi Esashi (江刺 正喜, Esashi Masayoshi, born January 30, 1949 Sendai, Miyagi) is an engineer. He is a global authority of Microelectromechanical systems and serves as the professor of the Tohoku University graduate school engineering graduate course.

== Background and education ==
Born in Sendai, Japan, in 1949, Masayoshi Esashi received his B.E. degree in electronic engineering in 1971 and a Doctor of Engineering degree in 1976 at Tohoku University.

== Career ==
Esashi served as a research associate from 1976 and an associate professor from 1981 at the Department of Electronic Engineering, Tohoku University. Since 1990 he has been a professor. Currently, he is the director of micro/nanomachining research and education center in Tohoku University. He is an associate director of the Semiconductor Research Institute.

He was a director of the Venture Business Laboratory in Tohoku University (1995–1998), and was a President of Sensor-Micromachine Society in Institute of Electrical Engineers in Japan (2002–2003). He has been a collaboration coordinator for Sendai city since 2004.

He served as a general co-chairman of the 4th IEEE Micro Electro Mechanical Workshop in 1991 held in Nara, Japan, as a general chairman of the 10th International Conference on Solid-State Sensors and Actuators (Transducers 99) in 1999 held in Sendai, Japan and Technical Program Chairman of IEEE Sensors 2006 being held in Daegu, Korea. He has also been studying microsensors and micromachined integrated systems (MEMS).

== Awards and honors ==
He was awarded the 2016 IEEE Jun-ichi Nishizawa Medal. In 2016 and 2017, he became a laureate of the Asian Scientist 100 by the Asian Scientist.

== Main works ==
- Foundation of a Semiconductor Integrated Circuit Design (半導体集積回路設計の基礎, Handōtaishūsekikairosekkei no Kiso)
- Micro Mashining and Micro Mechatronics (マイクロマシーニングとマイクロメカトロニクス, Maikuromashiiningu to Maikuromekatoronikusu) ISBN 4-563-03470-3
- Micro Machine --the Minute Machine which Works Wisely (マイクロマシン － 賢く働く微小機械, Maikuromashin - Kashikoku Hataraku Bishōkikai) ISBN 4-643-91130-1
