= Carlos Paz de Araújo =

Brazilian American scientist and inventor

Carlos A. Paz de Araújo is a Brazilian American scientist and inventor with nearly 600 patents registered in his name. Most of them are associated with nanotechnology, particularly a ferroelectric memory chip (FeRAM)

== Career and inventions ==
As a professor of electrical and computer engineering at the University of Colorado at Colorado Springs, Paz de Araújo's work has led to the development of integrated circuit-embedded FeRAMs used in smart cards, electronic money and other products.

Paz de Araújo is the founder of RAMTRON and Symetrix Corporations. He identified SrBi2Ta203 (SBT), the ferroelectric material used in the most advanced FeRAMs and which resolves the fatigue problem and fabrication difficulties in memory chips, ensuring that stored information is retained.

He and his colleagues were the first to use ferroelectric thin films as high-k capacitors for cellular phones, integrated into a set of gallium arsenide chips. The resulting devices were 50 times smaller and drew a fraction of the power of their predecessors. Working with scientists at Matsushita Electric Industry Company in Japan, he adapted SBT technology to contactless smart cards that permit information to be continuously upgraded during use.

Paz de Araujo is the editor of Integrated Ferroelectrics, and chairman of the International Symposium on Integrated Ferroelectrics. He has edited two books on integrated ferroelectrics and is the author of several papers on ferroelectrics.

Paz de Araujo holds a Bachelor's, Master's and Doctoral degrees in Electrical Engineering from the University of Notre Dame in South Bend, Indiana.

In 2006 Paz de Araujo won the Institute of Electrical and Electronics Engineers IEEE Daniel E. Noble Award.

Panasonic acquired 9% equity in Symetrix Corporation.
