= Martin Schadt =

Swiss physicist and inventor (born 1938)

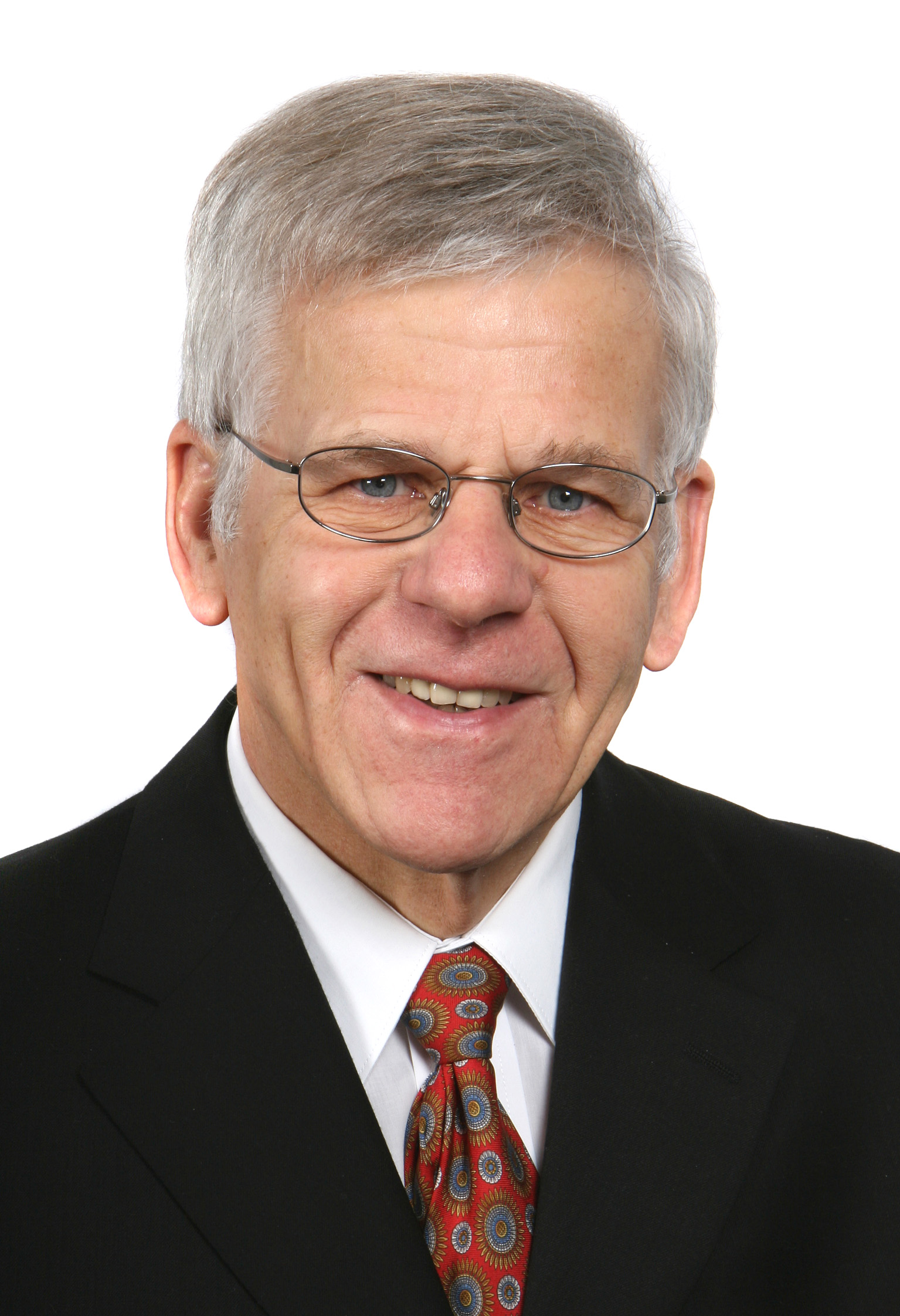
Martin Schadt (2007)

Martin Schadt (born 1938) is a Swiss physicist and inventor.

== Biography ==
In 1970, the physicists Martin Schadt and Wolfgang Helfrich invented the twisted nematic field effect (TN-effect) in the Central Research Laboratories of F. Hoffmann-La Roche Ltd, in Basel, Switzerland. The resulting patent CH532261 was licensed worldwide to electronics and watch industries and thus initiated a paradigm change towards flat panel field effect liquid crystal (LC) displays.

In the early 1970s, Martin Schadt started to investigate correlations between liquid crystal molecular structures, material properties, electro-optical effects and display performance to obtain criteria for novel, effect-specific liquid crystal materials for TN- and subsequent field-effect applications. His interdisciplinary approach involving physics and chemistry became the basis for modern industrial LC-materials research and led to the discovery and production of numerous new functional molecules and new electro-optical effects. In 1970, shortly after the invention of the TN-effect, he developed the first commercial room temperature nematic liquid crystal mixture with positive dielectric anisotropy, used in the displays of the first Japanese digital TN-LCD watches. The pharmaceutical company Roche established itself as a major supplier of liquid crystal materials for the emerging LCD-industry.

== Achievements ==
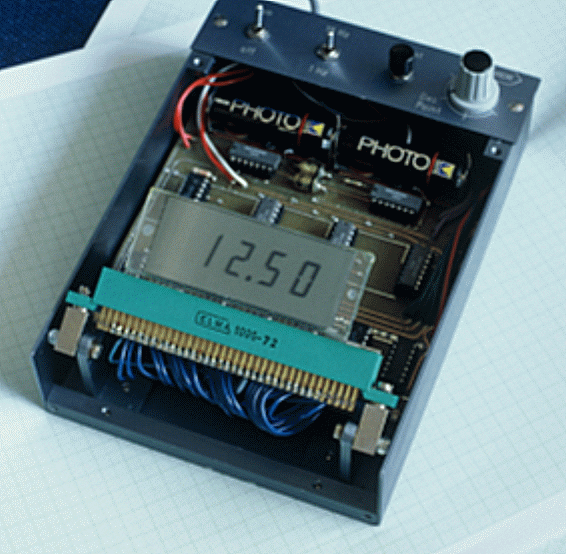
Early prototype of an alpha-numeric LCD based on the twisted nematic field-effect as realized in the laboratories of the Central Research Laboratories of F. Hoffmann-La Roche Ltd. by Martin Schadt and Wolfgang Helfrich. Photo by courtesy of M. Schadt.

Apart from his pioneering work on the TN-effect (i.e.e twisted nematic field effect), novel liquid crystal materials, organic semiconductors and biophysics, he invented or co-invented the following effects and technologies:

- first organic light-emitting diode (OLED) (1969 as post-doc at Canada's NRC; US patent 3,621,321),
- Kerr effect in LCs (1972),
- field-induced guest-host color switching (1979),
- dual frequency addressing and materials (1982),
- optical mode interference (OMI)-effect (1987,)
- deformed helix ferroelectric (DHF)- and short pitch bi-stable ferroelectric (SBF)-effect (1989, 1990),
- linearly photo-polymerisation (LPP)-technology (1991).

As principal inventor and head of Roche LC research he promoted the development of LPP-Photoalignment into manufacturing (1992–2002). As a key technology it enables contact free alignment and photo-patterning of monomeric and polymeric liquid crystals by optical means instead of mechanically. This has opened up novel display configurations as well as a wide range of new optical thin-film elements on single substrates, such as LC-interference color filters, optical retarders, cholesteric optical filters, wide-view films to enhance the field of view of LCDs, novel optical security elements for document and brand protection, stereo-polarizers as well as nano-and micro-corrugated optical polymer thin-film elements enabling polymeric antireflective and directional light scattering coatings.

The molecular design approach of Martin Schadt and his team has led to the discovery, patenting and production of the following commercially important liquid crystal classes: alkyl cyano Schiff'bases and esters (1971), phenyl-pyrimidines (1977), alkenyl liquid crystals which have become key for all state-of-the-art high-information content LCDs (1985–1995), numerous halogenated liquid crystals (1989–1995) as well as the first strongly non-linear optical (NLO)-ferroelectric liquid crystals (1992).

Until 1994 Martin Schadt was the head of the Liquid Crystal Research division of F. Hoffmann-La Roche Ltd. As a spin-off from Hoffmann-La Roche in 1994 he founded the interdisciplinary research and development company ROLIC Ltd. From 1994 until his retirement from the operating business in October 2002 Martin Schadt was CEO of ROLIC Ltd. and delegate of the board of directors. He retired from ROLIC in 2005 and is now active as a scientific advisor to various research groups and governmental agencies.

== Awards ==
- Roche Research and Development Prize, 1986, "For his decisive contributions to the knowledge of liquid crystal materials, their physical properties and electro-optics which have formed a basis for the breakthrough of a new display technology. His work has led to a new class of marketable products and to the scientific reputation of Roche in a new field."
- Special Recognition Award of American Society Information Display (SID), 1987, "For significant and continuing contributions to the theory and reduction to practice of high information content liquid crystal displays."
- Karl Ferdinand Braun Prize, 1992; highest recognition Award of the Society for Information Display, "For his outstanding and sustained scientific and technical contributions to the development of twisted nematic and other liquid crystal display technologies."
- Fellow Award Society for Information Display, 1992, "For his pioneering contributions to research and development of twisted nematic and other liquid crystal devices and materials."
- Aachener und Münchener Preis für Technik und angewandte Naturwissenschaften, 1994, "Für die bahnbrechende Erfindung der Flüssigkristallanzeige als Schlüsselbauelement der Informationstechnologie" (for the pioneering invention of the Liquid Crystal Display as a key-component for information technology).
- Robert-Wichard-Pohl Preis der Deutschen Physikalischen Gesellschaft, 1996, to Wolfgang Helfrich and Martin Schadt, "In Würdigung ihrer Erfindung und Entwicklung von Flüssigkristallanzeigen" (in appreciation of their invention and their development of Liquid Crystal Displays).
- 2008 IEEE Jun-ichi Nishizawa Medal together with Wolfgang Helfrich and James Fergason for pioneering development of twisted nematic liquid crystal technology.
- Eduard-Rhein Technologie-Preis 2009 for outstanding and internationally acknowledged achievements in the area of novel electro-optical operational principles for flat panel display applications, as well as the respective materials and device concepts; most notably, for co-inventing the twisted nematic liquid crystal effect - the crucial core technology for the success of LCDs - as well as other liquid crystal modes and linearly polymerized photo polymers.
- George W. Gray Medal of the British Liquid Crystal Society, 2010, for proposing the first OLED in 1969, for inventing the Kerr effect in liquid crystals in 1972, dual frequency addressing in 1982, deformed helix ferroelectrics in 1989, pioneering photo alignment and for the molecular design of new classes of commercially relevant liquid crystals.
- Blaise Pascal Medal in Material Science of the European Academy of Sciences, 2010. In recognition of his pioneering contributions to the development of Liquid Crystal Displays (LCDs) and Liquid Crystal Materials (LCs).
- Fellow Award of the European Academy of Sciences (2011)
- Frederiks Medal, the highest Award of the Russian Liquid Crystal Society for outstanding contributions in the field of liquid crystal physics (2011)
- Charles Stark Draper Prize awarded by the US National Academy of Engineering (NAE) to G. Heilmeier, W. Helfrich, M. Schadt and P. Brody, "for the engineering development of the Liquid Crystal Display (LCD) utilized in billions of consumer devices".
- European Inventor Award, (2013)

== Publications and patents summary ==
- 167 scientific publications in leading international journals,
- 110 lectures,
- Co-author of 4 books,
- More than 116 basic patents—among them 100 U.S. patents—each filed in 10–12 countries.

== Key publications ==
=== Books ===
- Schadt, M. (1994). "Liquid Crystal Displays". In H. Stegemeyer (ed.). Liquid Crystals. New York: Steinkopff/Springer. pp. 195–226.
- v. Zedtwitz, M.; Brauchli, M.; Schadt, M. (1996). "Ueberwindung nationaler Grenzen dargestellt am Beispiel der Liquid Crystal Display (LCD)-Technologie". In O. Gassmann; M. v. Zedtwitz (eds.). Internationales Innovations Management. Muenchen: Vahlen Verlag. pp. 143–154.
- Schadt, M. (1997). "Liquid Crystal Materials and Liquid Crystal Displays". In E. N. Kaufmann; Ch. J. Summers (eds.). Annual Review of Materials Sciences. Vol. 27. New York. pp. 305–375.
- Schadt, M. (1998). "Recent Advances in LPP-Photo-Alignment of Liquid Crystals Applied to the Phase-Retarder Image of Alfred Saupe". In P.E. Cladis; P. Palffy-Muhoray (eds.). Dynamics and Defects in Liquid Crystals. Amsterdam: Gordon and Breach Science Publishers. pp. 263–271.

== Sources ==
- Gerhard H. Buntz (Patent Attorney, European Patent Attorney, Physicist, Basel), "Twisted Nematic Liquid Crystal Displays (TN-LCDs), an invention from Basel with global effects", Information No. 118, October 2005, issued by Internationale Treuhand AG, Basel, Geneva, Zurich. Published in German
- M. Schadt: "Milestones in the History of Field-Effect Liquid Crystal Displays and Materials", Jpn. J. Appl. Phys. 48(2009), pp. 1–9
- David A. Dunmur and Horst Stegemeyer: "Crystals that Flow: Classic papers from the history of liquid crystals", Compiled with translation and commentary by Timothy J. Sluckin (Taylor and Francis 2004), ISBN 0-415-25789-1, History of Liquid Crystals Homepage
- Rolf Bucher: "Wie Schweizer Firmen aus dem Flüssigkristall-Rennen fielen", Das Schicksal von Roche und BBC-Entwicklungen in zehn Abschnitten", Neue Zürcher Zeitung, Nr.141 56 / B12, 20.06.2005
- Werner Becker, Hans-Juergen Lemp: "100 years of Commercial Liquid Crystal Materials", Information Display 2, 2004
- Merck KGaA, Corporate Communications: "100 years of Liquid Crystals at Merck: The history of the future." March 2004, Merck KGaA, Darmstadt, Germany
- Werner Becker (editor): "100 years Liquid Crystals", Liquid Crystal Newsletter No. 19, 2004, Merck KGaA, Darmstadt, Germany
- Michael Heckmeier, et al.: "Liquid Crystals for Active Matrix Displays", Merck KGaA, Darmstad, Germany
- Merck KGaA, Corporate Communications: "Liquid Crystals: Merck Makes Bits & Bytes Visible", Merck KGaA, Darmstad, Germany
