= IEEE David Sarnoff Award =

- Awarded for: Exceptional contributions to electronics
- Presented by: IEEE
- First award: 1959
- Final award: 2016
- Website: IEEE David Sarnoff Award

The IEEE David Sarnoff Award was a Technical Field Award presented in 1959–2016 by the Institute of Electrical and Electronics Engineers (IEEE). It was awarded annually for exceptional contributions to electronics.

The award was established in 1959 by the RCA Corporation; in 1989 the Sarnoff Corporation became its sponsor. It consisted of a bronze medal, certificate and honorarium, and was presented each year to an individual or small team (up to three people).

The award was discontinued in 2016.

== Recipients ==
Source: IEEE

- 1959: David Sarnoff
- 1960: Rudolf Kompfner
- 1961: Charles Townes
- 1962: Harry B. Smith
- 1963: Robert N. Hall
- 1964: Henri Busignies
- 1965: Jack A. Morton
- 1966: Jack Kilby
- 1967: James Hillier
- 1968: Walter P. Dyke
- 1969: Robert H. Rediker
- 1970: John Bertrand Johnson
- 1971: Alan L. McWhorter
- 1972: Edward G. Ramberg
- 1973: Max Mathews
- 1974: Frederik L. J. Sangster
- 1975: Bernard C. Deloach, Jr.
- 1976: George H. Heilmeier
- 1977: Harrison E. Rowe
- 1977: Jack M. Manley
- 1978: Donald G. Herzog
- 1979: Tingye Li
- 1979: A Gardner Fox
- 1980: Marshall I. Nathan
- 1981: Cyril Hilsum
- 1982: Nobutoshi Kihara
- 1983: Hermann K. Gummel
- 1984: Alan David White
- 1984: Jameson D. Rigden
- 1985: Henry Kressel
- 1986: Yasuharu Suematsu
- 1987: Alan B. Fowler
- 1987: Frank F. Fang
- 1988: Izuo Hayashi
- 1989: Charles V. Shank
- 1989: Herwig Kogelnik
- 1990: Leroy L. Chang
- 1991: Federico Capasso
- 1992: J. Jim Hsieh
- 1993: Rao R. Tummala
- 1994: Won-Tien Tsang
- 1995: Karl Hess
- 1996: Hiroyuki Sakaki
- 1997: Milton Feng
- 1998: Tatsuo Izawa
- 1999: Gerard A. Mourou
- 2000: Alastair Malcolm Glass
- 2001: P. Daniel Dapkus
- 2002: Young-Kai Chen
- 2003: Peter Asbeck
- 2004: Frederick A. Kish, Jr.
- 2005: Pierre Tournois
- 2006: Mau-Chung F. Chang
- 2007: Umesh K. Mishra
- 2008: James Coleman
- 2009: Kerry J. Vahala
- 2009: Kam-Yin Lau
- 2009: Yasuhiko Arakawa
- 2010: Mark Rodwell
- 2011: Constance J. Chang-Hasnain
- 2012: Hideo Ohno
- 2013: Sajeev John
- 2014: Larry A. Coldren
- 2015: Pallab Bhattacharya
- 2016: Hiroyuki Matsunami

== See also ==
- List of engineering awards
- List of awards named after people
