= IEEE Jun-ichi Nishizawa Medal =

- Awarded for: Outstanding contributions to material and device science and technology, including practical application
- Presented by: Institute of Electrical and Electronics Engineers
- First award: 2002

In 2002, the Institute of Electrical and Electronics Engineers (IEEE) added a new award to its already existing program of awards. Each year, one or more nominees are honored with a medal in the name of Jun-ichi Nishizawa, considered to be the father of Japanese microelectronics. Nishizawa was professor, director of two research institutes and the 17th president at Tohoku University, Sendai, Japan, and contributed important innovations in the fields of optical communications and semiconductor devices, such as laser and PIN diodes and static induction thyristors for electric power applications.

This medal is awarded by the IEEE on a yearly basis to nominees in the fields of materials science and device technologies.

Sponsor of this award is the Federation of Electric Power Companies, Japan.

== Recipients ==
The following have won the award:

- 2004: Frederick H. Dill
- 2005: Jerry M. Woodall
- 2006: Hideo Sunami, Mitsumasa Koyanagi, Kiyoo Itoh
- 2007: Nicolaas Frans De Rooij
- 2008: Wolfgang Helfrich, Martin Schadt, James Fergason
- 2009: Chenming Hu
- 2010: Richard M. Swanson
- 2011: Bernard Lechner, Peter Brody, Fang Cheng Luo
- 2012: Mark T. Bohr, Robert S. Chau, Tahir Ghani
- 2013: Burn J. Lin
- 2014: Franz Laermer and Andrea Urban
- 2015: Dimitri Antoniadis
- 2016: Masayoshi Esashi
- 2017: Ching W. Tang, Stephen R. Forrest, and Mark E. Thompson
- 2018: Joe C. Campbell
- 2019: Yasuhiko Arakawa, Pallab Bhattacharya, and Dieter Bimberg
- 2020: Paul Daniel Dapkus
- 2021: James J. Coleman
- 2022: Umesh Mishra
- 2023: James S. Harris
- 2024: John E. Bowers
- 2025: Robert Dutton
- 2026: Eric R. Fossum
