= Edith M. Bairdain =

American psychologist

- Bairdain in 1964
- Born: June 6, 1922; Atlanta, Georgia, U.S.
- Died: June 8, 2015 (aged 93); Marietta, Georgia, U.S.

Edith Munro Bairdain (June 6, 1922 – June 8, 2015) was the first woman to graduate from Emory University with a PhD in psychology. She was on the editorial advisory board for Information Display, an early human-interfaces journal. Bairdain and her husband both worked on PSYOP for the Vietnam War. She was one of the founders of the Society for Information Display and promoted better ways to display useful and important information.

== Biography ==
Bairdain was born on June 6, 1922, and raised in Atlanta, Georgia. She attended Columbia University where she earned her bachelor's degree in psychology and her masters in group development. She earned her PhD in experimental psychology from Emory University in 1961. She started working for ITT's Data and Information Systems Division in Paramus, New Jersey, that same year. Her work at ITT involved working on human interactions with information displays in air traffic control. In March 1966, she became a staff scientist at Communication Systems, Inc (CSI) in Paramus.

Bairdain helped create the Society for Information Display. She gave talks about how much information individuals were able to "absorb and use effectively" to make decisions. She also proposed computer systems to make driving on freeways safer.

Between 1969 and 1971 she and her husband Ernest F. Bairdain researched PSYOP in Vietnam, producing an interim report, a main report, and twenty reports on narrower topics. Their study has been called "the standard reference cited by all later authors studying the effectiveness of PSYOP in Vietnam".
