= C&C Prize =

NEC C&C Prize
- Awarded for: For outstanding contributions to semiconductors, computers, telecommunications and their integrated technologies
- Sponsored by: NEC C&C Foundation, JAPAN
- Date: 1985
- Location: Tokyo
- Country: Japan
- First award: 1985
- Website: www.candc.or.jp/en/index.html

The NEC C&C Prize (Japanese: C&C賞) is an award given by the NEC Corporation "in recognition of outstanding contributions to research and development and/or pioneering work in the fields of semiconductors, computers, telecommunications and their integrated technologies." Established in 1985, through the NEC's nonprofit C&C Foundation, C&C Prizes are awarded to two groups or individuals annually. There is no restriction on nationality of nominees. Winners will receive a prize which includes a cash award of 10,000,000 yen and a certificate. The award ceremony is held annually in Tokyo, Japan.

== Recipients ==
Medal recipients include Nobel Prize winners and scientists, from the father of optics to the pioneer of Internet.

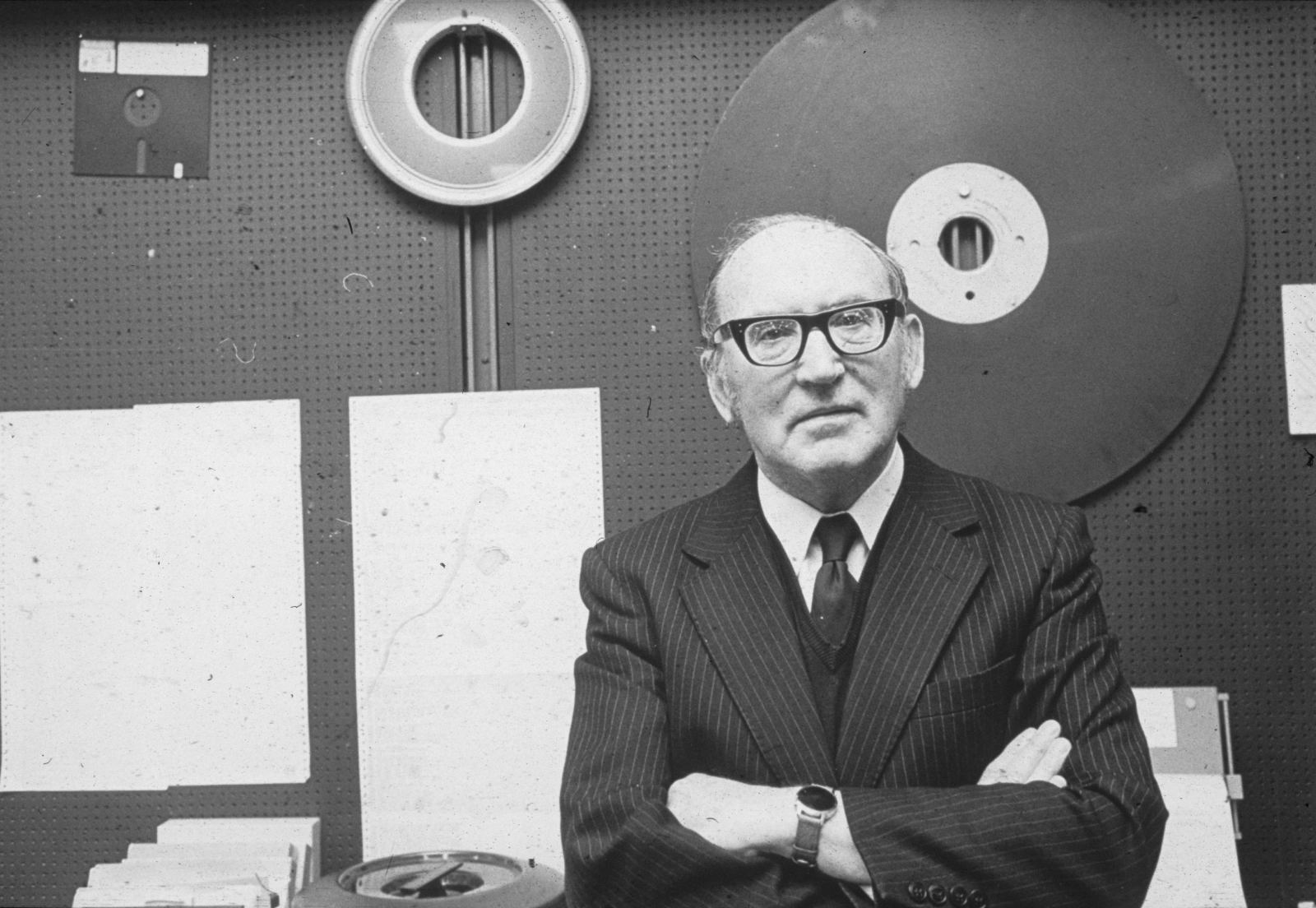
Wilkes: First Electronic Computer - C&C Prize, 1981

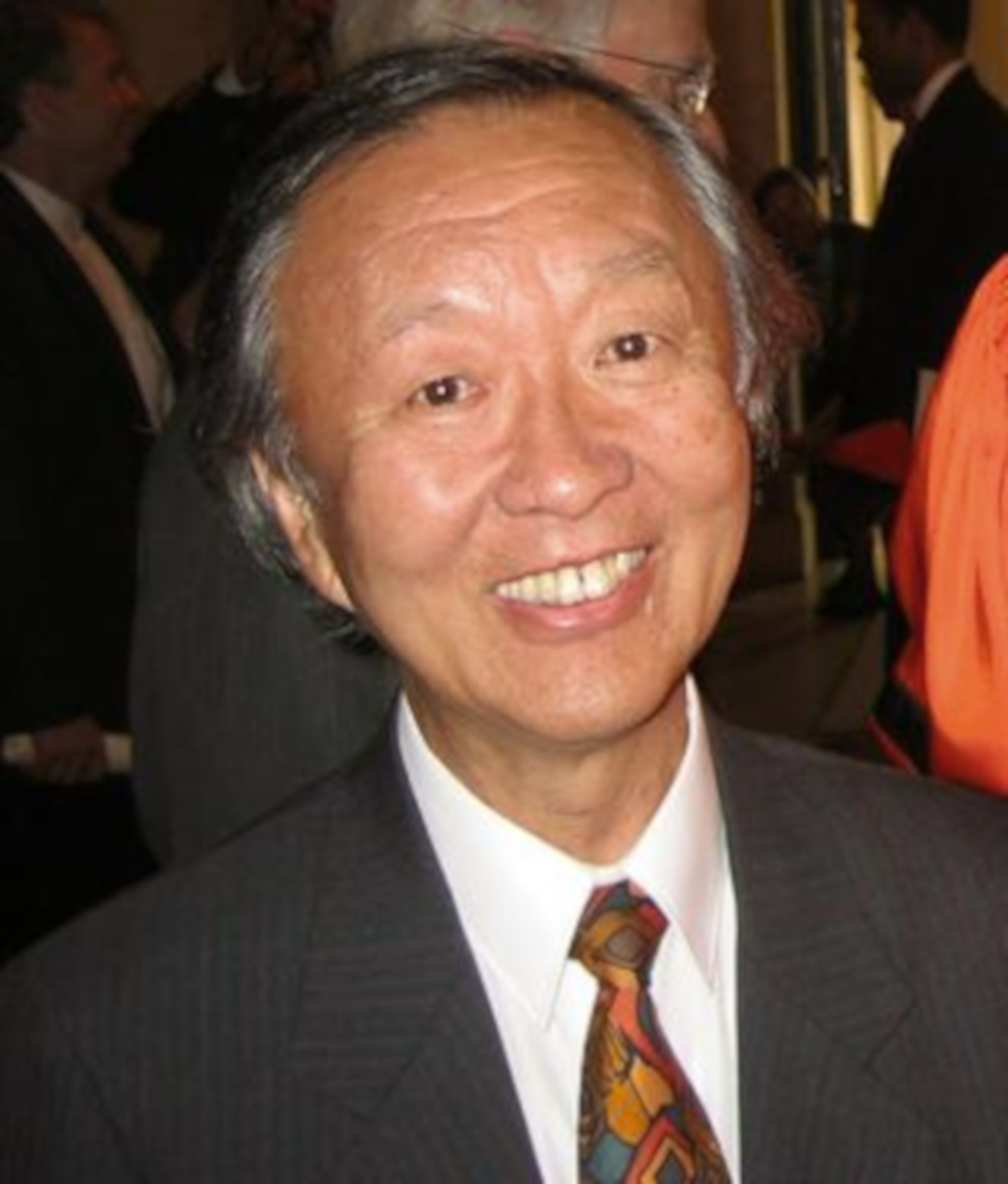
Kao: Father of Optics - C&C Prize, 1987

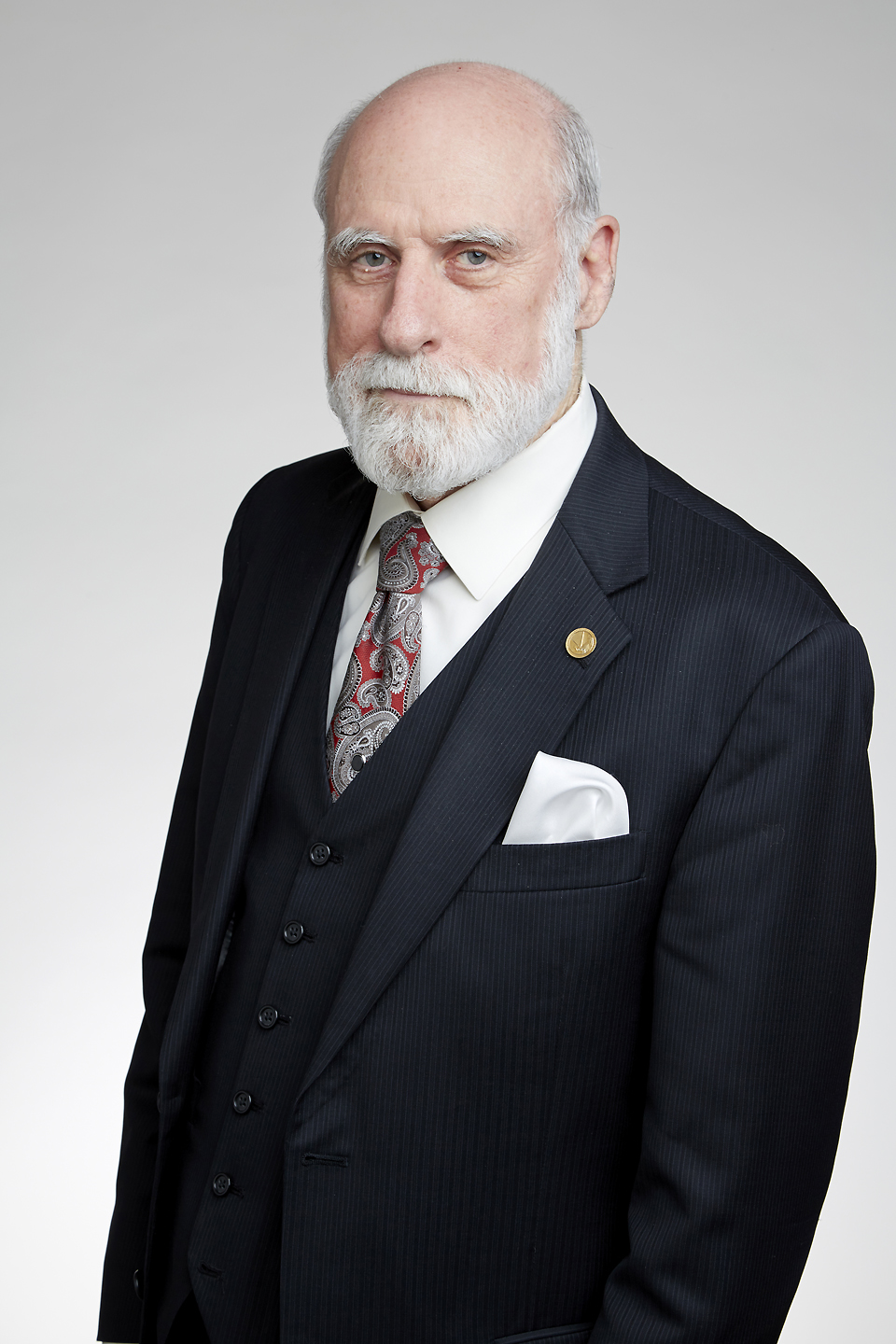
Vint: Internet Pioneer - C&C Prize, 1996

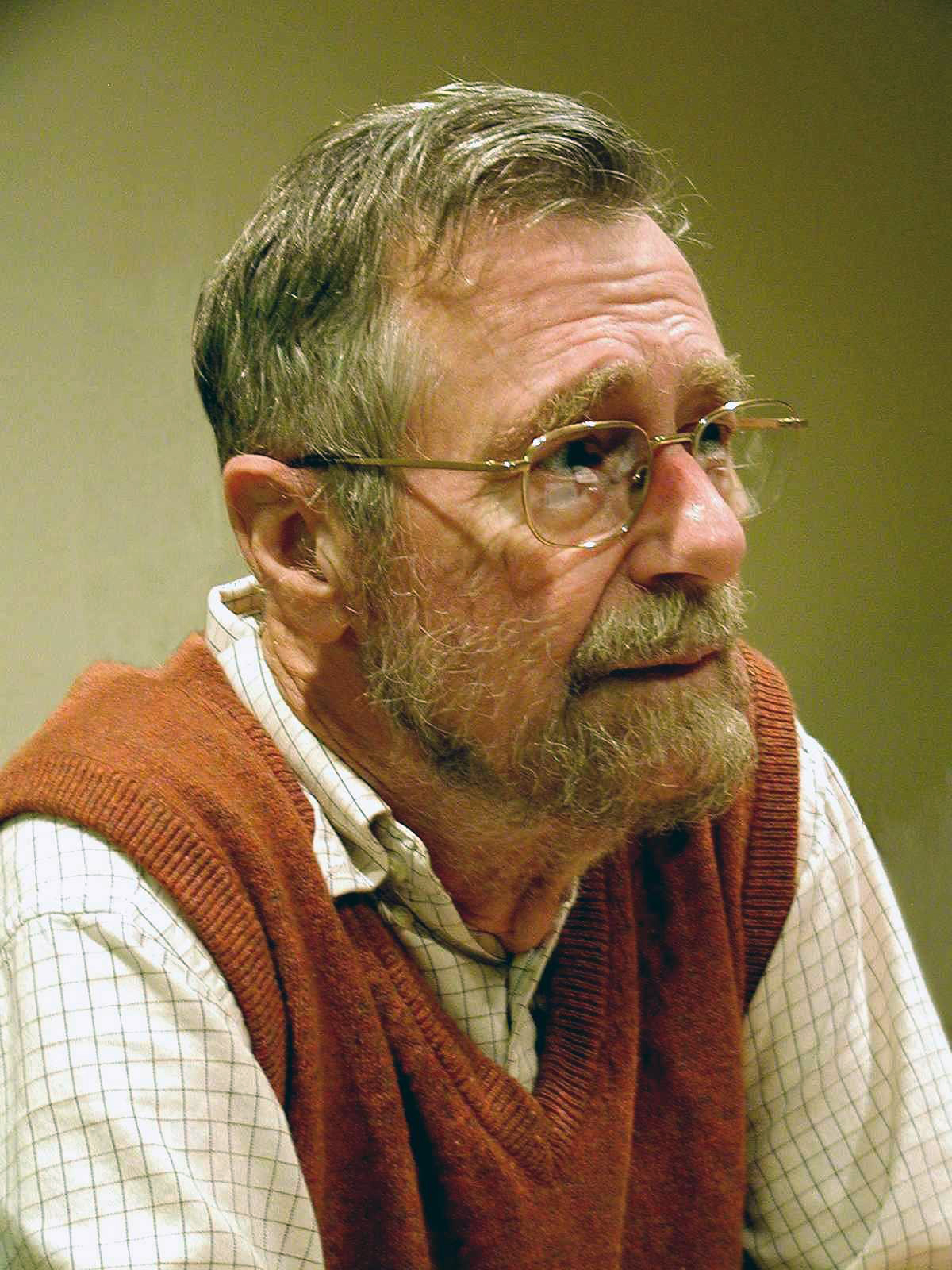
Dijkstra: Shortest Path - C&C Prize, 2002

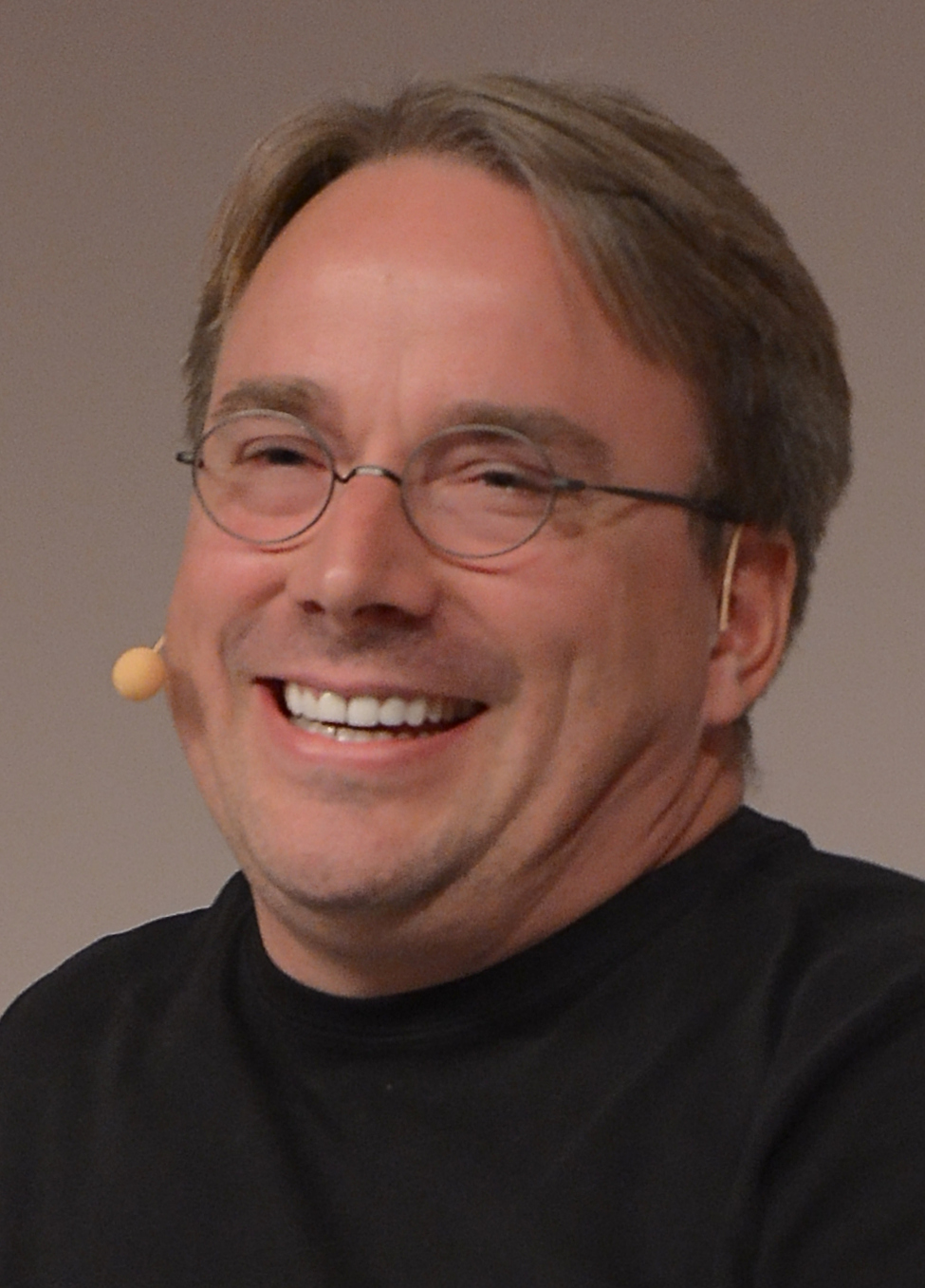
Linus: Creator of Linux - C&C Prize, 2010

=== Years (2018–present) ===
- 2023 Recipients
  - Group A: Yasunobu Nakamura, Tsai Jaw-Shen
  - Group B: Guido van Rossum
- 2022 Recipients
  - Group A: Satoshi Matsuoka
  - Group B: Charles H. Bennett, Gilles Brassard
- 2021 Recipients
  - Group A: Kunihiko Fukushima
  - Group B: Rodney Brooks
- 2020 Recipients
  - Group A: Jun Murai
  - Group B: Michael Stonebraker
- 2019 Recipients
  - Group A: Yasuhiko Yasuda, Mitsutoshi Hatori
  - Group B: Leslie Lamport
- 2018 Recipients
  - Group A: Hidetoshi Nishimori
  - Group B: Ching W. Tang

=== Years (2007–2017) ===
- 2017 Recipients
  - Group A: Mitsuo Kawato
  - Group B: Alfred Aho, John Hopcroft, and Jeffrey Ullman
- 2016 Recipients
  - Group A: Hideo Ohno
  - Group B: Geoffrey Hinton
- 2015 Recipients
  - Group A: Prof. Masaru Kitsuregawa
  - Group B: Dr. Martin Casado, Prof. Nick McKeown, Prof. Scott Shenker
- 2014 Recipients
  - Group A: Prof. Shigeo Tsujii, Dr. Hideki Imai
  - Group B: Dr. Jan Uddenfeldt, Dr. Irwin M. Jacobs, Prof. Fumiyuki Adachi
- 2013 Recipients
  - Group A: Prof. Kazuro Kikuchi, Masataka Nakazawa
  - Group B: Prof. Vladimir Vapnik
- 2012 Recipients
  - Group A: Dr. Osamu Yamada, Dr. Toru Kuroda, Mr. Masayuki Takada
  - Group B: Dr. Hisashi Kobayashi
- 2011 Recipients
  - Group A: Dr. Akira Yoshino
  - Group B: Dr. Norman Abramson, Dr. Robert Metcalfe
- 2010 Recipients
  - Group A: Dr. Hiroyuki Sakaki, Dr. Yasuhiko Arakawa
  - Group B: Dr. Linus Torvalds
- 2009 Recipients
  - Group A: Dr. Fumitada Itakura
  - Group B: Prof. Ronald L. Rivest, Prof. Adi Shamir, Prof. Leonard M. Adleman
- 2008 Recipients
  - Group A: Dr. Hideo Aiso (Japanese: 相磯秀夫)
  - Group B: Prof. Albert-László Barabási
- 2007 Recipients
  - Group A: Dr. Robert D. Maurer, Dr. John B. MacChesney, Dr. Tatsuo Izawa (Japanese: 伊澤達夫)
  - Group B: Dr. Kenichi Iga (Japanese: 伊賀健一)

=== Years (1996–2006) ===
- 2006 Recipients
  - Group A: Dr. Ken Sakamura
  - Group B: Dr. Robert H. Dennard
- 2005 Recipients
  - Group A: Mr. Kei-ichi Enoki (Japanese: 榎啓一), Mr. Takeshi Natsuno (Japanese: 夏野剛), Ms. Mari Matsunaga (Japanese: 松永真理)
  - Group B: Dr. Robert E. Kahn, Dr. Lawrence G. Roberts, Prof. Leonard Kleinrock
- 2004 Recipients
  - Group A: Dr. Zen'iti Kiyasu (Japanese: 喜安善市)
  - Group B: Prof. John L. Hennessy, Prof. David A. Patterson
- 2003 Recipients
  - Group A: Dr. Shun-ichi Amari (Japanese: 甘利俊一)
  - Group B: Dr. Gordon E. Moore
- 2002 Recipients
  - Group A: Dr. Tadao Umesao (Japanese: 梅棹忠夫)
  - Group B: Dr. Edsger Wybe Dijkstra
- 2001 Recipients
  - Group A: Dr. Takuo Sugano (Japanese: 菅野卓雄)
  - Group B: Dr. Alan C. Kay
- 2000 Recipients
  - Group A: Dr. Takeo Kanade (Japanese: 金出武雄)
  - Group B: Dr. Robert W. Dutton
- 1999 Recipients
  - Group A: Dr. Makoto Nagao (Japanese: 長尾真)
  - Group B: Dr. Willard S. Boyle, Dr. George E. Smith
- 1998 Recipients
  - Group A: Prof. Fernando J. Corbató
  - Group B: Dr. Isamu Akasaki (Japanese: 赤﨑勇), Dr. Shuji Nakamura (Japanese: 中村修二)
- 1997 Recipients
  - Group A: Dr. John L. Moll
  - Group B: Dr. Barry G. Haskel, Dr. Arun N. Netravali
- 1996 Recipients
  - Group A: Mr. Paul Baran, Dr. Vinton G. Cerf, Mr. Tim Berners-Lee
  - Group B: Prof. Donald O. Pederson, Prof. Ernest S. Kuh, Prof. Ronald A. Rohrer

=== Years (1985–1995) ===
- 1995 Recipients
  - Group A: Dr. Akira Hasegawa (Japanese: 長谷川晃)
  - Group B: Dr. Alfred Yi Cho
- 1994 Recipients
  - Group A: Dr. John Cocke
  - Group B: Dr. Yasuharu Suematsu (Japanese: 末松安晴), Dr. Takanori Okoshi
- 1993 Recipients
  - Group A: Dr. Shun'ichi Iwasaki (Japanese: 岩崎俊一)
  - Group B: Prof. William A. Gambling, Prof. David N. Payne
- 1992 Recipients
  - Group A: Dr. Toshiyuki Sakai (Japanese: 坂井利之)
  - Group B: Dr. Eberhardt Rechtin, Mr. Walter K. Victor, Dr. Andrew J. Viterbi
- 1991 Recipients
  - Group A: Dr. Yasuo Tarui (Japanese: 垂井康夫), Dr. Hiroo Toyoda (Japanese: 豊田博夫)
  - Group B: Dr. Jack M. Sipress
- 1990 Recipients
  - Group A: Dr. George H. Heilmeier
  - Group B: Dr. Takuro Muratani (Japanese: 村谷拓郎), Dr. Yasuhiko Ito (Japanese: 伊藤泰彦)
- 1989 Recipients
  - Group A: Dr. Noboru Takagi (Japanese: 高木昇), Dr. Shigebumi Saito (Japanese: 斉藤成文), Dr. Tamiya Nomura (Japanese: 野村民也)
  - Group B: Mr. Dennis M. Ritchie, Mr. Kenneth L. Thompson
- 1988 Recipients
  - Group A: Prof. Maurice V. Wilkes
  - Group B: Dr. John S. Mayo, Mr. Eric E. Sumner, Mr. M. Robert Aaron
- 1987 Recipients
  - Group A: Dr. Hiroshi Inose
  - Group B: Dr. Charles Kuen Kao
- 1986 Recipients
  - Group A: Dr. Jerome B. Wiesner
  - Group B: Dr. Izuo Hayashi, Dr. Morton B. Panish
- 1985 Recipients
  - Group A: Dr. Hideo Yamashita (Japanese: 山下英男), Dr. Hiroshi Wada (Japanese: 和田弘)
  - Group B: Dr. Lawrence A. Hyland, Dr. Harold A. Rosen
  - Group C: Dr. Joseph V. Charyk, Mr. Sidney Metzger
