= Yasuhiko Arakawa =

Japanese physicist

Yasuhiko Arakawa (Japanese 荒川 泰彦, Arakawa Yasuhiko; born 6 November 1952) is a Japanese physicist.

His research focuses on semiconductor physics, including growth of nanostructures and their optoelectronic applications. Among his main achievements are the proposal of the concept of quantum dots and their application to quantum dot lasers, the observation of exciton-polariton Rabi-splitting in a semiconductor microcavity, or, recently, the first 3D photonic crystal nanocavity lasers with quantum dot gain.

== Biography ==
Yasuhiko Arakawa received a B.S. degree in 1975 and a Ph.D. degree in 1980, respectively, from the University of Tokyo, both in electronics engineering. In 1981 he became an assistant professor at the University of Tokyo and in 1993, was promoted full professor there. He is now at the Institute of Industrial Science, the University of Tokyo and is also the director of Institute for Nano Quantum Information Electronics. He has been a visiting scientist of the California Institute of Technology in the period 1984–1986 and visiting professor at the Technical University of Munich in the period 2009–2011.

He has been a member of the Science Council of Japan since 2009.

He was also elected as a member into the National Academy of Engineering in 2017 for contributions to quantum dot lasers and related nanophotonic devices.

== Awards ==
- Niwa Memorial Award
- Excellent Paper Award des IECE
- Young Scientist Award
- International Symposium on GaAs and Related Compound Semiconductors
- IBM Award
- Distinguished Achievement Award des IEICE
- Hattori Hoko Award
- Sakura-Kenjiro Award von OITDA
- Electronics Award from IEICE
- Nissan Science Award
- 2004 Esaki Award (with Hiroyuki Sakaki)
- 2009 IEEE David Sarnoff Award
- 2010 NEC C&C Foundation Awards 2010 C&C Prize
- 2011 Nick Holonyak Jr. Award
- 2018 and 2020 Asian Scientist 100, Asian Scientist
- 2019 IEEE Jun-ichi Nishizawa Medal
- 2023 Person of Cultural Merit
