= John Tyndall Award =

- Awarded for: An individual who has made pioneering, highly significant, or continuing technical or leadership contributions to fiber optics technology
- Location: Optical Fiber Communication Conference (OFC)
- Presented by: The Optical Society and IEEE Photonics Society
- First award: 1987
- Website: John Tyndall Award

The John Tyndall Award is given to the "individual who has made pioneering, highly significant, or continuing technical or leadership contributions to fiber optics technology". The award is named after John Tyndall (1820-1893), who demonstrated for the first time internal reflection.

This award is sponsored and presented by both the IEEE Photonics Society (formerly called IEEE Lasers and Electro-Optics Society) and The Optical Society (OSA).

Recipients of this award will receive a special crystal sculpture that represents the concept of total internal reflection (endowed by Corning, Inc.), a scroll, and an honorarium.

== Recipients ==
Following people received the John Tyndall Award:

- 2026 Graham Trevor Reed
- 2025 Masatoshi Suzuki
- 2024 David Richardson
- 2023 Ming-Jun Li
- 2022 Meint Smit
- 2021 Michal Lipson
- 2020: Roel Baets
- 2019: Kim Roberts
- 2018: Peter J. Winzer
- 2017: Evgeny M. Dianov
- 2016: Alan H. Gnauck
- 2015: P. Daniel Dapkus
- 2014: Kazuro Kikuchi
- 2013: James J. Coleman
- 2012: John E. Bowers
- 2011: David F. Welch
- 2010: C. Randy Giles
- 2009: Joe C. Campbell
- 2008: Robert W. Tkach
- 2007: Emmanuel Desurvire
- 2006: Donald R. Scifres
- 2005: Rogers H. Stolen
- 2004: Larry A. Coldren
- 2003: Andrew Chraplyvy
- 2002: Neal S. Bergano
- 2001: Tatsuo Izawa
- 2000: Stewart Personick
- 1999: John B. MacChesney
- 1998: Kenichi Iga
- 1997: Ivan P. Kaminow
- 1996: Kenneth O. Hill
- 1995: Tingye Li
- 1994: Elias Snitzer
- 1993: Yasuharu Suematsu
- 1992: Donald B. Keck
- 1991: David N. Payne
- 1990: Thomas G. Giallorenzi
- 1989: Stewart E. Miller
- 1988: Michael K. Barnoski
- 1987: Robert D. Maurer

== See also ==
- List of engineering awards
- List of physics awards
