= Emmanuel Desurvire =

French physicist

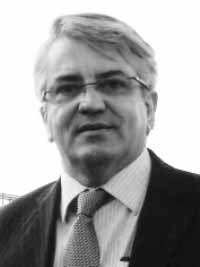
Emmanuel Desurvire

Emmanuel Desurvire (born 1955) is a French researcher and writer. He is the recipient of 2007 John Tyndall Award.

== Early life ==
Desurvire was born in 1955, in Boulogne, France to Raymond Desurvire, an aircraft engineer and Marcelle Desurvire, a psychologist.

Desurvire attended University of Paris where he received his M.S. degree in theoretical physics in 1981 and University of Nice, where he completed his Ph.D. in 1983.

== Career ==
In 2005, he was awarded with the William Streifer Scientific Achievement Award.

In 1998, he received Benjamin Franklin Medal.

In 2007, he received John Tyndall Award for his contributions in the development of Erbium-doped fiber amplifiers.

== Awards ==
- 2007: John Tyndall Award
- 2022: VinFuture Grand Prize
