= Robert D. Maurer =

American industrial physicist (1924–2025)

- Born: July 20, 1924; Arkadelphia, Arkansas, U.S.
- Died: September 9, 2025 (aged 101); Eugene, Oregon, U.S.
- Education: University of Arkansas (BS); Massachusetts Institute of Technology (PhD)
- Known for: Optical fiber

Robert D. Maurer (July 20, 1924 – September 9, 2025) was an American industrial physicist noted for his leadership in the invention of optical fiber.

In 1979, Maurer was elected a member of the National Academy of Engineering for contributions to the technology of low-loss fibers for optical communication.

== Early life ==
Maurer was born either in Arkadelphia, Arkansas, or by other accounts in Richmond Heights, Missouri. In 1943 he enlisted in the United States Army Reserve and began studies at the University of Arkansas. He was quickly called up for active service, and studied preengineering for about one year at the Huntsville, Texas, state college. In 1944 he shipped overseas with the 99th infantry division for combat in France and Belgium along the German border. He was wounded by a landmine, spending more than 20 months in the hospital before receiving a disability discharge with Purple Heart.

Supported by the GI Bill, Maurer returned in 1946 to the University of Arkansas to study chemical engineering, but quickly switched to physics. He graduated with a B.S. in physics in 1948, then performed graduate work at Massachusetts Institute of Technology, where he measured second sound velocity in liquid helium. He took his orals in summer 1951, and graduated with a physics PhD in the winter class.

== Corning ==
In 1952 Maurer joined the physics department of Corning Glass Works, becoming manager of its applied physics group in 1960, and ultimately research fellow in 1978. He retired from Corning Incorporated in 1989.

Around 1966 Maurer learned of Charles K. Kao's pioneering work in optical fibers at the Standard Telephones and Cables company in the United Kingdom, and initiated a project to develop such fibers at Corning. In 1970 Maurer and his colleagues Donald Keck and Peter C. Schultz designed and produced the first fiber with optical losses low enough for use in telecommunications by a novel process of depositing titania-doped silica inside a quartz tube using a flame-hydrolysis process and sintering, then fusing it to draw into fiber. They demonstrated optical loss as low as 20 dB/km, which for the first time indicated a practical technology.

== Honours and awards ==
Maurer was an elected member of the National Academy of Engineering (1979) and inducted into the National Inventors Hall of Fame (1993), and a fellow of the American Ceramic Society, Institute of Electrical and Electronics Engineers, and American Physical Society, and has received numerous honors including the American Institute of Physics' 1978 Prize for Industrial Physics, the 1978 IEEE Morris N. Liebmann Memorial Award, the Swedish Academy of Engineering's 1979 L.M. Ericsson International Prize for Telecommunications, an honorary LL.D. Degree from the University of Arkansas in 1980, the Industrial Research Institute's 1986 Achievement Award, the 1987 John Tyndall Award from IEEE Lasers and Electro-Optics Society and Optical Society of America, the 1989 Naval Research Laboratory Citation, the American Physics Society's 1989 International Prize for New Materials, the 1999 Charles Stark Draper Prize, the 2000 National Medal of Technology, and the 2007 NEC C&C Prize.

== Patents ==
Maurer held 16 patents, including:

- US Patent 3,659,915: Fused Silica Optical Waveguide; Method of Producing Optical Waveguide Fibers
- US Patent 3,711,262: Optical Fibers

== Death ==
Maurer died in Eugene, Oregon on September 9, 2025, at the age of 101.
