= Ching Wan Tang =

Hong Kong–American physical chemist

- 鄧青雲
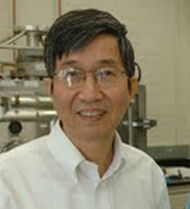
- Born: July 23, 1947 (age 79); Yuen Long, British Hong Kong
- Citizenship: United States
- Education: King's College, Hong Kong; University of British Columbia; Cornell University
- Known for: Work on organic LED and hetero-junction organic photovoltaic cell
- Awards: Jan Rajchman Prize (2001); Carothers Award (2001); Humboldt Research Award (2005); Daniel E. Noble Award (2007); Wolf Prize in Chemistry (2011); Eduard Rhein Award (2013); Nick Holonyak, Jr. Award (2014); IEEE Jun-ichi Nishizawa Medal (2017); C&C Prize (2018); Kyoto Prize (2019)
- Scientific career
- Fields: Physical chemistry, chemical engineering
- Workplaces: University of Rochester; Hong Kong University of Science and Technology; Eastman Kodak

Ching Wan Tang (Chinese: 鄧青雲; pinyin: Dèng Qīngyún; born July 23, 1947) is a Hong Kong–American physical chemist. He was inducted into the National Inventors Hall of Fame in 2018 for inventing OLED (together with Steven Van Slyke), and was awarded the 2011 Wolf Prize in Chemistry. Tang is the IAS Bank of East Asia Professor at the Hong Kong University of Science and Technology and previously served as the Doris Johns Cherry Professor at the University of Rochester.

== Biography ==
Ching Wan Tang was born in Yuen Long, British Hong Kong in 1947. He attended secondary school at Yuen Long Public Secondary School in Hong Kong and later received his senior high school education at King's College. He graduated with a BS in chemistry from the University of British Columbia, Canada, and subsequently earned his PhD in physical chemistry from Cornell University in the US in 1975. He joined Eastman Kodak in 1975 as a research scientist, was promoted to senior research scientist in 1981, to research associate in 1990, and to senior research associate in 1998. In 2003 he was named distinguished fellow of the Kodak Research Laboratories, Eastman Kodak Company. In 2006 he joined the University of Rochester as the Doris Johns Cherry Professor.

Tang is the inventor of several groundbreaking electronic devices, including the OLED (organic light-emitting diode), and the hetero-junction organic photovoltaic cell (OPV). Efficient OLEDs of small molecules were first developed by Tang at the research department of Eastman Kodak Company in the 1970s. Tang is widely recognized as one of the leaders in the organic electronics industry and in photovoltaics. Tang was elected as a member into the National Academy of Engineering in 2006 for "the invention of the organic light-emitting device and organic bilayer solar cell, the bases of modern organic electronics".

In addition to his pioneer research on the OLED and OPV, Tang made a number of critical innovations resulting in the commercialization of a new flat-panel display technology. These innovations include "the development of robust transport and luminescent materials, improved device architectures, novel color pixilation methods, and fabrication processes for the manufacture of passive-matrix OLED displays; and the adaptation of active-matrix backplane technology for high-definition OLED displays".

On February 15, 2011, Tang was awarded the Wolf Prize in Chemistry, together with Stuart A. Rice and Krzysztof Matyjaszewski. The official citation for the three professors from the Wolf Foundation reads: "For deep creative contributions to the chemical sciences in the field of synthesis, properties and an understanding of organic materials; for exploring the nature of organic solids and their energy profiles, structure and dynamics and for creating new ways to make organic materials, ranging from polymers, to organic-based devices that capture energy from the sun, and light our way in the dark; and for groundbreaking conceptual and experimental advances that have helped to create the research field of organic materials."

On December 5, 2015, Tang was elected a founding member of the Academy of Science of Hong Kong.

== Honors and recognition ==
=== Memberships ===
- 1998, Fellow of the American Physical Society;
- 2002, Fellow of the Society for Information Display;
- 2006, Member of the United States National Academy of Engineering;
- 2015, Founding member of the Academy of Sciences of Hong Kong;

=== Awards ===
- 1994, Eastman Kodak Distinguished Inventor, from the Eastman Kodak Company;
- 1999, Eastman Kodak Team Achievement Award, from the Eastman Kodak Company;
- 2000, Eastman Innovation Award, from the Eastman Kodak Company;
- 2001, Jan Rajchman Prize, from the Society for Information Display;
- 2001, Carothers Award, from the American Chemical Society;
- 2001, Northeast Regional Innovation Award, from the American Chemical Society;
- 2002, Rochester Law Association Inventor of the Year Award, from the Rochester Intellectual Property Law Association;
- 2003, Team Innovation Award, from the American Chemical Society;
- 2003, Distinguished fellow of the Kodak Research Laboratories, from the Eastman Kodak Company;
- 2005, Humboldt Research Award, from the Alexander von Humboldt Foundation, Germany;
- 2006, Doris Johns Cherry Professorship, from University of Rochester;
- 2007, Daniel E. Noble Award, from the IEEE;
- 2010, Lifetime Achievement Award, from the Hajim School of Engineering and Applied Sciences, University of Rochester.
- 2010, Chair Professorship, from the Institute of Functional Nano & Soft Materials, Soochow University.
- 2011, Wolf Prize in Chemistry, from the Wolf Foundation
- 2013, Eduard Rhein Award, from the Eduard Rhein Foundation;
- 2013, IAS Bank of East Asia Professorship, from the Hong Kong University of Science and Technology.
- 2014, Nick Holonyak Jr. Award, from the Optical Society.
- 2017, IEEE Jun-ichi Nishizawa Medal, from the IEEE;
- 2018, C&C Prize, from the NEC C&C Foundation;
- 2018 and 2019, Asian Scientist 100, Asian Scientist
- 2019, Kyoto Prize in Advanced Technology (Materials Science and Engineering).

=== Honorary titles ===
- 2002, honorary professor, Shanghai University, China;
- 2002, honorary professor, South China University of Technology, China;
- 2010, doctorate honorary degree, Shanghai University, China;
- 2013, CE Hall of Fame, from the Consumer Electronics Association.
- 2018, Inductee, National Inventors Hall of Fame.

== Notable publications ==
- Tang, C. W. (January 13, 1986). "Two‐layer organic photovoltaic cell". Applied Physics Letters. 48 (2). AIP Publishing: 183–185. Bibcode:1986ApPhL..48..183T. doi:10.1063/1.96937. ISSN 0003-6951.
- Tang, C. W.; VanSlyke, S. A. (September 21, 1987). "Organic electroluminescent diodes". Applied Physics Letters. 51 (12). AIP Publishing: 913–915. Bibcode:1987ApPhL..51..913T. doi:10.1063/1.98799. ISSN 0003-6951.
- Tang, C. W.; VanSlyke, S. A.; Chen, C. H. (1989). "Electroluminescence of doped organic thin films". Journal of Applied Physics. 65 (9). AIP Publishing: 3610–3616. Bibcode:1989JAP....65.3610T. doi:10.1063/1.343409. ISSN 0021-8979.
- Van Slyke, S. A.; Chen, C. H.; Tang, C. W. (October 7, 1996). "Organic electroluminescent devices with improved stability". Applied Physics Letters. 69 (15). AIP Publishing: 2160–2162. Bibcode:1996ApPhL..69.2160V. doi:10.1063/1.117151. ISSN 0003-6951.
