= Takatoshi Tsujimura =

Japanese scientist and businessman

Takatoshi Tsujimura is a Japanese scientist and businessman known for display and lighting commercialization.

He is the president of SID (Society for Information Display), world's largest information display society, located in Campbell, CA, USA. He was selected as one of the "10 best engineers/researcher in 10 best Japanese companies" by Nikkei Electronics Magazine in 2001.

Tsujimura demonstrated high color reproduction OLED technology using so called "White + Color Filter" method. Tsujimura has also made the world's first manufacturing of roll-to-roll OLED lighting using plastic barrier film technology.

He has been awarded Fellow titles from both SID and IEEE and has received SID Special Recognition Award in 2007 and IEEE-EDS Paul Rappaport Award in 2016.

== Biography ==
Tsujimura was born in Tokyo and studied at University of Tokyo for BS degree and later received PhD degree in Engineering at Tokyo Institute of Technology.

His early career was devoted for the development of large displays. After school, he joined IBM Yamato Laboratory, known as the birthplace of Thinkpad, he was engaged in the development of large LCD displays for laptop computing. He reported many new TFT processing technologies, necessary for large LCD displays in many conferences, such as low resistance wiring and high performance TFTs. He also demonstrated (at that time) world's largest 20-inch active-matrix OLED displays in SID 2003 conference using unique amorphous silicon TFT backplanes and received SID Special Recognition Award.

He moved to Kodak Japan as a director of display development and lead the OLED display product business with their world's first active-matrix OLED display factory "SK display", Sanyo-Kodak JV. At the time, OLED applications were only for small electronics equipments, such as cameras or MP3 players. Although it was widely known that OLED technology has advantage over other display technologies in terms of response time, wide viewing angle and contrast, all suitable for large television, however shadow mask technology used for mobile display manufacturing was not applicable to large displays. It was also known that matured color filter pixeleration technology combined with white OLED emission would be suitable for high yield manufacturing, however large light absorption by color filter was the bottleneck to achieve low power consumption and high color reproduction. To circumvent the situation, Tsujimura and his team tried color-science simulation of all possible combination of OLED/color filter formulation and driving condition, and also made development of all associated technologies to make the scenario happen, bringing in novel approaches. As a consequence, he reported successful fabrication of OLED display prototype equipping both 100% NTSC color reproduction and lower power consumption than LCDs in International Display Workshop 2008, which enabled the current OLED television manufacturing. He received SID Fellow Award and IEEE Fellow Award for his achievement.

Later, Tsujimura changed his focus to flexible OLED lighting at Konica Minolta. He demonstrated roll-to-roll flexible OLED lighting manufacturing in SID 2015 conference. He also reported color tunable three-dimensional OLED device and received IEEE EDS Paul Rappaport Award in 2017.

In business side, he became the Chief Technology Officer of Konica Minolta Pioneer OLED Inc in 2017 and is a Konica Minolta Technology Fellow. He is currently the president of Society for Information Display, world's largest information display society, located in Campbell, California.

== Publications ==
Tsujimura is holding 144 worldwide patents and his OLED textbook "OLED Display Fundamentals and Applications" is read by global readers. It is available in English, Japanese, Chinese and Korean
