= Alan David White =

American physicist

- Education: Rutgers University; Syracuse University
- Scientific career
- Fields: laser science
- Workplaces: Bell Labs

Alan David White (1923 — 9 May 2020) was an American physicist, known primarily as one of the inventors of the visible helium-neon laser.

== Biography ==
After completing his military service during World War II, White graduated due to the G.I. Bill. He earned degrees in physics and mathematics from Rutgers University and Syracuse University. From 1953 to 1983 he worked at Bell Laboratories. Then he was a scientific consultant for Tropel Corp.

He was fond of art, in particular, sculpture.

For his achievements he was awarded the 1984 IEEE David Sarnoff Award, and in 2000 he was elected to the New Jersey Inventors Hall of Fame.

== Scientific achievements ==
The first gas laser, using a mixture of helium and neon, was demonstrated in 1960 and emitted radiation at a wavelength of 1.15 μm (infrared range). Two years later, White, together with Dane Rigden, showed that a helium-neon laser can emit radiation at a wavelength of 632.8 nm, i.e., in the visible range of the spectrum. In subsequent years, White, with Eugene I. Gordon and others, investigated the reasons for the limitation of the power of such lasers, established scaling laws for gas-discharge lasers, and developed frequency stabilization methods for such devices. The first continuous-wave visible laser, invented by White and Rigden, is still widely used in research and education, and is a part of various instruments.

White also made significant contributions to the development of lenses for microlithography, as well as methods for aligning a lithographic mask using special lenses and Fresnel zone plates.

== Select publications ==
- White, Alan D. (1959). "New hollow cathode glow discharge". Journal of Applied Physics. 30 (5): 711–719. Bibcode:1959JAP....30..711W. doi:10.1063/1.1735220.
- White, Alan D.; Rigden, J.D. (1962). "Continuous gas maser operation in the visible". Proceedings of the IRE. 50 (7): 1697. doi:10.1109/JRPROC.1962.288157.
- White, Alan D.; Gordon, E.I. (1963). "Excitation mechanisms and current dependence of population inversion in HeNe lasers". Applied Physics Letters. 3 (11): 197–199. Bibcode:1963ApPhL...3..197W. doi:10.1063/1.1753846.
- White, Alan D. (1965). "Frequency Stabilization of Gas Lasers". IEEE Journal of Quantum Electronics. QE-1 (8): 349–357. Bibcode:1965IJQE....1..349W. doi:10.1109/JQE.1965.1072246.
- Bruning, J.H.; Herriott, D.R.; Gallagher, J.E.; Rosenfeld, D.P.; White, A.D.; Brangaccio, D.J. (1974). "Digital wavefront measuring interferometer for testing optical surfaces and lenses". Applied Optics. 13 (11): 2693–2703. Bibcode:1974ApOpt..13.2693B. doi:10.1364/AO.13.002693. PMID 20134757.

== Sources ==
- White, Alan D. (2011). "Recollections of the First Continuous Visible Laser". Optics and Photonics News. 22 (10): 34–39. doi:10.1364/OPN.22.10.000034.
- Bruning, John H.; Webb, Colin E. (2020). "Alan D. White, 1923–2020". Optics and Photonics News. 31 (9): 54.
