= Stewart D. Personick =

- Born: 1947 (age 78–79)
- Education: City College of New York; MIT
- Scientific career
- Fields: Optical communication
- Thesis: Efficient analog communication over quantum channels
- Doctoral advisor: Robert S. Kennedy

Stewart David Personick (born 1947) is an American researcher in telecommunications and computer networking. He worked at Bell Labs, TRW, and Bellcore (now Telcordia Technologies), researching optical fiber receiver design, propagation in multi-mode optical fibers, time-domain reflectometry, and the end-to-end modeling of fiber-optic communication systems.

== Biography ==
Personick was born in Brooklyn in 1947 and attended the Bronx High School of Science. He graduated from the City College of New York with bachelor of electrical engineering degree in 1967 and joined Bell Laboratories. He obtained an SM degree in 1968 and Sc.D degree in 1970 from MIT with support from Bell Laboratories. His dissertation was on analog communication over quantum channels.

At Bell Labs Personick conducted early research in fiber optics technology, including publication of papers on optical receiver design, applications of optical amplifiers, and propagation in multi-mode optical fibers with mode coupling. Some of his early analysis developed a model that included what became known as "the Personick integrals" as basic parameters for the capacity of optical systems. His research was used in early fiber-optic system field tests, including a 1976 experiment in Atlanta, Georgia, and the 1977 Chicago lightwave communication project, which demonstrated the technical and economic viability of optical fiber systems. In 1976 he invented the first practical optical time-domain reflectometer, a test instrument that became heavily used in the fiber optics industry.

From 1978 through 1983, Personick was a manager at TRW Inc. He managed organizations responsible for research and development of commercial telecommunications transmission and switching equipment, and organizations responsible for US federal government-funded research applications of optical communication technologies.

In 1983 Personick joined Bell Communications Research (Bellcore). There, he managed organizations responsible for the creation of new telecommunications technologies. These included: fiber-to-the-home, asymmetric digital subscriber line, Integrated Services Digital Network, the Intelligent Network (customized call processing applications that depend upon customer-specific data stored in centralized “services control points”), wireless telecommunications networks, and packet-switched public telecommunications network services, including acting as the interface between the traditional telecommunications industry and the emerging Internet access industry. He managed systems engineering organizations, ranging in size from 150 to 400 and research organizations ranging in size from 100 to 150 persons. He helped shape telecommunications research policy through participation in national level committees such as the Federal Networking Council, and by influencing executives of the telecommunications industry. He initiated external government-funded research projects at Bellcore as an additional source of research funding. In 1993 he predicted social changes from the technology progress.

Personick joined Drexel University's ECE department of electrical engineering and computer science on September 1, 1998, as the first E. Warren Colehower Chair Professor of Telecommunications, and as the first director of Drexel's Center for Telecommunications and Information Networking. He acquired and managed more than $30 million in externally funded research contracts over 5 years. His research and teaching included calculating the channel capacity of optical fiber. and optical switching, an application of photonics.

In 2003 Personick was appointed a member of the US Federal Communications Commission’s Technological Advisory Council. The council met approximately quarterly to discuss technology-related topics of interest to the FCC, in the context of airing issues and making recommendations to the FCC and the FCC's Office of Engineering and Technology. The TAC's last meeting was held in July 2006. Personick served on the board of directors for Optical Communications Products, Inc. from November 2000 through October 2007, when it was acquired by Oplink Communications.

Personick joined New Jersey Institute of Technology's department of electrical and computer engineering on February 18, 2008, as the first Ying Wu Endowed Chair in Wireless Telecommunications until 2011. From September 1, 2011, to December 31, 2012, Personick was a senior university lecturer at NJIT.

== Honors ==
Personick was elected a fellow of the Optical Society of America in 1988 in recognition of distinguished service in the advancement of optics. He received the John Tyndall Award, sponsored by the Optical Society of America (OSA) and the IEEE Lasers and Electro-Optics Society (LEOS), for career achievements and contributions to the field of optical fiber communications in April 2000.

Personick became a Fellow of the Institute of Electrical and Electronics Engineers (IEEE), in 1983 for contributions to the theory and application of optical fiber systems, and an IEEE Centennial Medal in 1984. At various times Personick served as IEEE Communications Society journal editor, board of governors, director of publications, VP for member affairs, and representative on the steering committee of the Optical Fiber Communication conference. He was the technical program committee co-chair of the 1983 Optical Fiber Communication conference, general co-chair of the 1985 Optical Fiber Communication conference, and member and chair of the John Tyndall Award committee.

Personick was elected a member of the US National Academy of Engineering (NAE) in 1992. He served on the US NAE Board on Army Science and Technology, member and chairman of other US NAE committees and panels. He co-edited a report on "Critical Information Infrastructure Protection and the Law" published by the United States National Research Council in 2003.

He received a career achievement award from Engineering Alumni of the City College of New York in 1998.

== Works ==
=== Patents ===
- U.S. patent 4,001,578 John Stone Cook; Stewart David Personick (August 1, 1975). "Optical communication system with bipolar input signal". Published January 4, 1977
- U.S. patent 4,076,375 Willis Martin Muska; Stewart David Personick (December 24, 1975). "Directional optical waveguide coupler and power tap arrangement". Published February 28, 1978
- U.S. patent 4,236,256 Charles A. Brackett; Stewart D. Personick (March 26, 1979). "Asynchronous data receiver". Published November 25, 1980
- U.S. patent 4,477,725 Charles K. Asawa; Joseph W. Austin; Michael K. Barnoski; Allan R. Jackson; Stewart D. Personick; Shi-Kay Yao (August 27, 1981). "Microbending of optical fibers for remote force measurement". Published October 16, 1984
- U.S. patent 4,642,804 Stewart D. Personick (May 10, 1985). "Shared laser lightwave transmission systems". Published February 10, 1987
- U.S. patent 4,658,394 Steven S. Cheng; Jan Lipson; Stewart D. Personick (December 12, 1984). "Optical transmission". Published April 14, 1987

=== Books ===
- Stewart D. Personick (May 1968). Noise Due to Time-varying Current Excitation of Carbon Resistors. MIT MS Thesis.
- Stewart D. Personick (1970). Efficient analog communication over quantum channels. Massachusetts Institute of Technology. Department of Electrical Engineering Sc.D. Thesis.
- Stewart D. Personick (1981). Optical fiber transmission systems. Plenum Press. ISBN 0306405806.
- Stewart D. Personick (1985). Fiber Optics: Technology and Applications. Springer. ISBN 0306420791.
- Stewart D. Personick; Hongyuan Shi; Dinesh Shankar (2000). Ultra-high-capacity Router Switching Fabrics Using Phototonic Technologies. Air Force Research Laboratory, Information Directorate, Rome Research Site.
