= Rajiv Joshi =

Rajiv V. Joshi is an Indian-American prolific inventor and research staff member at IBM's Thomas J. Watson Research Center. His work focuses on the development of integrated circuits and memory chips. He is an IEEE Fellow and received the Industrial Pioneer Award from the IEEE Circuits and Systems Society in 2013 and the IEEE Daniel E. Noble Award in 2018. He holds over 300 U.S. patents. Joshi was elected Vice-President of Industry for the IEEE Circuits and Systems Society (CASS) in 2025.

== Education ==
Joshi holds a bachelor of technology in mechanical engineering from IIT Bombay. He came to the United States in 1977 to pursue a master's degree at MIT and a doctoral degree at Columbia University.

== Technical Innovations ==
Integrated Circuit Interconnect

Dr. Joshi led innovation in new materials for integrated circuit interconnects, including refractory metals contacts, liners, and deposition techniques, chemical mechanical polishing processes, and large grain copper to prevent adverse effects. These inventions enabled replacement of conventional aluminum by copper and allowed achievement of multi-level wiring for further miniaturization of chips with low power. In state of the art microprocessors, there over 15 Billion transistors and over 50 km of Copper Interconnect.

Predictive Failure Analytics for Big Data

Joshi led development of many techniques for accelerating Predictive Analytics. This approach more rapidly estimates failure and optimizes the objective function. His techniques are 5-6 orders of magnitude faster than the conventional techniques which set the research across multiple CAD companies.

Advanced Integrated Circuit Memory

Joshi created several novel high speed memory innovations including MRAM, TRAM, IN-Memory computation enabling memory technology to scale beyond previously predicted Moore's Law limits, while improving bandwidth, performance and data movement.

Technology-Circuit Co-design

Joshi demonstrated the first high performance register file which helped to make the decision to change from bulk to SOI technology. Joshi demonstrated first time application of FinFET for low power and high performance SRAM and proposed strained non-planar devices. Such FinFETs are widely used in the industry.

Low Power Circuits

Joshi developed lower power circuits for energy efficient. Low power is essential for functionality and performance of VLSI Circuits . present/future Internet of everything (IOE) requires such techniques. Joshi's recent low power memory operating at 0.3V is an example. His work received wide spread publicity in EE Times.

== Awards ==
- In 2020 Rajiv Joshi won the "Inventor of the Year" award by New York Intellectual Property Law Association.
- Elected to Board of Governors (BOG), IEEE, Circuits and Systems Society, 2019.
- In 2018 IEEE Daniel E. Noble Award
- Fellow, World Technology Network, Dec 2016
- Best Editor for IEEE Trans on TVLSI July 2016
- Inducted into New Jersey Inventor Hall of Fame 2014 (other honorees include Nikola Tesla)
- In 2013 Industrial Pioneer Award from the IEEE Circuits and Systems Society
- IEEE/ACM William J. Mccalla ICCAD Best Paper Award, ICCAD 2009
- Distinguished Alumnus Award, Indian Institute of Technology, Bombay, India 2008
- IEEE International Symposium on Quality Electronics and Design (ISQED) Fellow, 2007
- IEEE Fellow 2001 for contributions to chip metallurgy materials and processes, and high performance processor and circuit design
