= Yasuharu Suematsu =

Japanese scientist

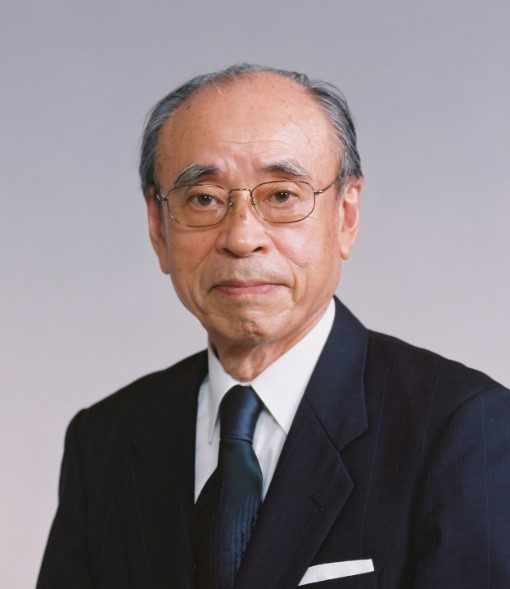
- Suematsu in 2006
- Born: September 22, 1932 (age 93); Gifu, Japan
- Education: Tokyo Institute of Technology
- Known for: Contributing to the development of optical fiber communication
- Awards: 2015 The Order of Culture, from the Emperor of Japan. 2014 Japan Prize; 2003 IEEE James H. Mulligan Jr. Education Medal; 1996 Medal of Honour with Purple Ribbon; 1994 C&C Prize; 1994 John Tyndall Award 1986 IEEE David Sarnoff Award
- Scientific career
- Fields: Optical communications
- Notable students: Yoshihisa Yamamoto

Yasuharu Suematsu (末松 安晴, Suematsu Yasuharu; born September 22, 1932) is a Japanese electrical engineer who is recognised for his contributions to developments in fiber-optic communication technology. His research in the field of electromagnetic radiation concerning dynamic single-mode lasers has also been cited in several academic and technical studies. Suematsu is professor emeritus at the Institute of Science Tokyo.

== Biography ==
Yasuharu Suematsu was born on September 22, 1932, in Gifu, Japan. He received his Bachelor of Science in Engineering (1955) and PhD (1960) from the Tokyo Institute of Technology. He later joined the faculty of the Tokyo Institute of Technology as a professor. In 1989, he was appointed President of the University. In 1993, he became the inaugural President of Kochi University of Technology while also serving as Director General of the National Institute of Informatics. During the same year, he was elected a member of the National Academy of Engineering (US) with the citation: "For contributions to the understanding and development of optical fibers, high-performance semiconductor lasers, and integrated optoelectronics."

He is a Foreign Associate of the National Academy of Engineering, a Foreign Member of the National Academy of Engineering of Korea, an Optica Fellow, and a Fellow of the Institute of Electrical and Electronics Engineers.

He has authored 19 books and more than 260 scientific papers.

== Social contribution by research ==
Optical fiber communications make up a highly dense communication network that encircles the globe and is used in several applications including middle-distance Ethernet. Additionally, dynamic single-mode lasers in the 1.5 micrometer band are used for optical lines from the exchange to the home in Fiber To The Home (FTTH) applications. The transmission performance of fiber has increased exponentially yearly.

== See also ==
- Distributed-feedback laser
- Charles K. Kao
