= Herwig Kogelnik =

American physicist and engineer

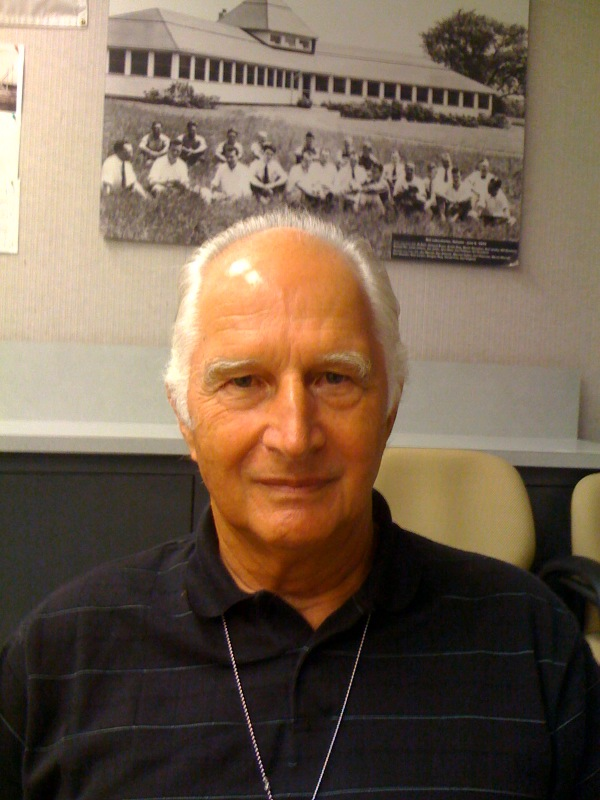
- Born: June 2, 1932 (age 94); Graz, Austria
- Education: Vienna University of Technology, Oxford University
- Awards: National Medal of Technology (2006); IEEE Medal of Honor (2001); Marconi Prize (2001); IEEE David Sarnoff Award (1989); Frederic Ives Medal (1984); J. J. von Prechtl Medal; IEEE Quantum Electronics Award
- Scientific career
- Fields: Electrical engineering
- Workplaces: Bell Labs, Alcatel-Lucent

Herwig Kogelnik (born June 2, 1932) is an Austrian-American electrical and optical engineer. He is best known for his fundamental contributions to the developments in laser technology, optoelectronics, photonics and lightwave communications systems. His work over a 40-year career at Bell Labs earned him the Marconi Prize, the IEEE Medal of Honor, the National Medal of Technology and many other awards.

In a series of papers in the early 1960s, he developed the theory of stable optical resonators, which has been fundamental to laser developments ever since. He then turned to the applications of holograms to optical systems, developing with some of his colleagues the basic theory of thick holograms that led to the development of a whole range of optical components, including filters and couplers to integrated optical devices. His innovation was the beginning of the "distributed feedback laser." He also contributed the development of wavelength-division multiplexing.

Kogelnik was elected a member of the National Academy of Engineering in 1978 for contributions to the understanding of optical propagation modes, thick film holography, and invention of the distributed feedback laser.

== Biography ==
He was born in Graz, Austria on June 2, 1932. He received an engineering degree from the Technische Hochschule in Vienna, Austria in 1955, and also a Doctor of Technology Degree in 1958. In 1960 he received a DPhil from St Peter's College, Oxford University. In 1961 he joined Bell Laboratories in Holmdel, New Jersey where he became Director of both the Electronics Research Laboratory and the Photonics Research Laboratory. He was the president of the Optical Society of America in 1989. An OSA Fellow since 1972, he was elected an Honorary Member of the society in 2005, "For achievements in several areas of optics and photonics, contributions to lightwave communications by directing industrial research and for leadership in the scientific community." He holds 35 patents. In 2012 he continued active engineering work.

== See also ==
- Optical Society of America#Presidents
