= Kazuro Kikuchi =

Japanese researcher

Kazuro Kikuchi is a professor in the Department of Electrical Engineering and Information Systems at the University of Tokyo and a long-time researcher on fiber-optic communications.

== Professional background ==
Kikuchi received a B.S. degree in electrical engineering and M.S. and Ph.D. degrees in electronic engineering from the University of Tokyo. He joined their Department of Electronic Engineering in 1979, where he is currently a professor.

== Career ==
Kikuchi has published more than 200 peer-reviewed journal articles, 250 conference papers, several book chapters, and three books. He is a fellow of the Institute of Electrical and Electronics Engineers Photonics Society, the Optical Society, and the Institute of Electronics, Information and Communication Engineers. His research has focused on optical fiber communications, including optical devices and systems. He is currently involved in coherent optical communication systems that realize multi-level modulation formats with digital signal processing. He has also worked at the Research Center for Advanced Science and Technology, the Department of Frontier Informatics, and Bell Communications Research. He also serves on the board of directors for Alnair Labs Corporation.

== Awards ==
- Institute of Electronics, Information and Communication Engineers Achievement Award
- Ichimura Award
- Japan IBM Science Prize
- Sakurai Memorial Award
- Hattori Hokosho Prize
- Ericsson Telecommunications Award
- Shida Rinzaburo Prize
- Japan’s Prime Minister Award for the promotion of academy-industry collaboration
- NEC C&C Prize, 2013 - for "pioneering and leading contributions to the advancement of coherent optical fiber communications systems
- Named a fellow of the Institute of Electrical and Electronics Engineers, 2013 - for "contributions to coherent optical communication systems"
- John Tyndall Award, 2014 – for "pioneering contributions to the fundamental understanding of coherent detection techniques," from the Optical Society and the Institute of Electrical and Electronics Engineers Photonics Society
