= John B. MacChesney =

American chemist (1929–2021)

John Burnette MacChesney II (July 8, 1929 – September 30, 2021) was an American scientist. A Bell Labs pioneer in optical communication, he was best known for his 1974 invention of the modified chemical vapor deposition (MCVD) process with colleague P.B. O'Connor, and for co-inventing high-purity "sol-gel" overcladding for optical fiber in the early 1980s. These inventions were key to the commercial manufacture of optical fiber.

== Biography ==
John Burnette MacChesney II was born in Glen Ridge, New Jersey, on July 8, 1929, to John Burnette MacChesney I. Raised in Caldwell, New Jersey, he graduated from Grover Cleveland High School (since renamed as James Caldwell High School).

He received his B.A. degree from Bowdoin College in 1951, served in the U.S. Army during the Korean War, and subsequently studied at City College of New York and New York University while working in New York City. In 1959 he received his Ph.D. in geochemistry from Pennsylvania State University, and joined Bell Labs, examining electrical and magnetic properties of ceramics and single crystals. In 1972 he turned his attention to glass and then to erbium and other rare-earth materials for fiber optic amplifiers.

MacChesney was an adjunct professor at Brown and Rutgers universities, as well as the Kwangju Institute of Science and Technology in Korea, and held more than a hundred domestic and foreign patents. He received the Charles Stark Draper Prize (1999), the John Tyndall Award (1999), the IEEE Morris N. Liebmann Memorial Award (1978), and other awards from the American Ceramic Society, the Institute of Electrical and Electronics Engineers, the American Physical Society, Sigma Xi, and the Research and Development Council of New Jersey. In 1985, MacChesney was elected a member of the National Academy of Engineering for leadership in the invention of processes to make glasses for optical fiber and for transfer of these processes to manufacturing.

MacChesney died on September 30, 2021, at the age of 92.

== Sources ==
- Draper Prize biography
- Bell Labs press release (Oct. 8, 1999)
