= Takanori Okoshi =

Japanese electrical engineer and composer (1932–1994)

Takanori Okoshi (大越孝敬; September 16, 1932 – November 4, 1994) was a Japanese professor of electrical engineering and an amateur composer of over 30 pieces of chamber music for quartet or sextet.

== Life and career ==
Okoshi was born on September 16, 1932 in Tokyo, where his father was an engineering professor at the University of Tokyo. In his school days, he made radio sets and motors, and subsequently received a bachelor's degree in electrical engineering from the University of Tokyo in 1955, specializing in electronics and communications. His bachelor's thesis work, "The Generation of Millimeter Waves by Harmonic Generators" was published in the journal of the Institute of Electrical Communications Engineers of Japan. His then received both masters' and doctoral degrees from the University of Tokyo, working on electron guns under the supervision of Professor Okamura, later President of the Tokyo Denki University.

Immediately after receiving his PhD, Okoshi was appointed lecturer at the University of Tokyo where he remained until retirement. As professor, he was a renowned expert in optoelectronics and holography, planar circuits, and optical fiber communication. From April 1963 through the fall of 1964, he visited Bell Labs at the invitation of Michiyuki "Mickey" Uenohara, where he worked on electron guns but also became acquainted with lasers. After his return to Tokyo, he started work on a novel idea for the soft landing collector tube, which he first described publicly in the 1970 International Electron Devices Meeting in Washington DC. From about 1967, he began theoretical work on three-dimensional imaging, and by the early 1970s about half the activities in his laboratories concerned optoelectronics. A notable invention from those years was wide view projection holography; he also wrote several textbooks in the field. From about 1980 onwards, his interest shifted to planar circuits, optical fiber communications, and photon counting.

After his retirement from the University of Tokyo in 1993, Okoshi was named director of the Japanese government's National Institute for Advanced Interdisciplinary Research (NAIR).

He served as president of the Institute of Television Engineers and the IEICE (The Institute of Electronics, Information and Communication Engineers), and vice president of the Engineering Academy of Japan and the International Union of Radio Science (URSI). He has been awarded the 1993 Japan Academy Prize for "Research on Coherent Optical Fiber Communications", 1994 C&C Prize, Fujiwara Prize, and 1988 IEEE Morris N. Liebmann Memorial Award "for leadership in and pioneering contributions to coherent optical fiber communications."

Okoshi died on November 4, 1994, at the age of 62.

== Publications ==
- Okoshi, Takanori Three-Dimensional Imaging Techniques 2nd ed., Atara Press (2011), ISBN 978-0-9822251-4-1
- Okoshi, Takanori Planar Circuits for Microwaves and Lightwaves, Springer-Verlag (1985), ISBN 978-3-642-70083-5

== Sources ==
- TAKANORI OKOSHI: An Interview Conducted by William Aspray, Center for the History of Electrical Engineering, May 23, 1994
- IEEE Morris N. Liebmann Memorial Award Recipients
- Radio Science Bulletin No. 271, December 1994: In Memoriam - Takanori Okoshi 1932 – 1994
