= Peter Asbeck =

American engineer (born 1947)

Peter Asbeck (born September 7, 1947) is an American engineer, currently the Skyworks Professor in High Performance Communications Devices and Circuits at the University of California, San Diego Jacobs School of Engineering, and a publisher author. He is a member of the National Academy of Engineering. for contributions to heterojunction bipolar transistor and integrated circuit technology. He is a power amplifier expert. In 2000, Peter Asbeck was elevated to IEEE fellow for development of heterostructure bipolar transistors and applications.
