= Steven Van Slyke =

American chemist (born 1956)

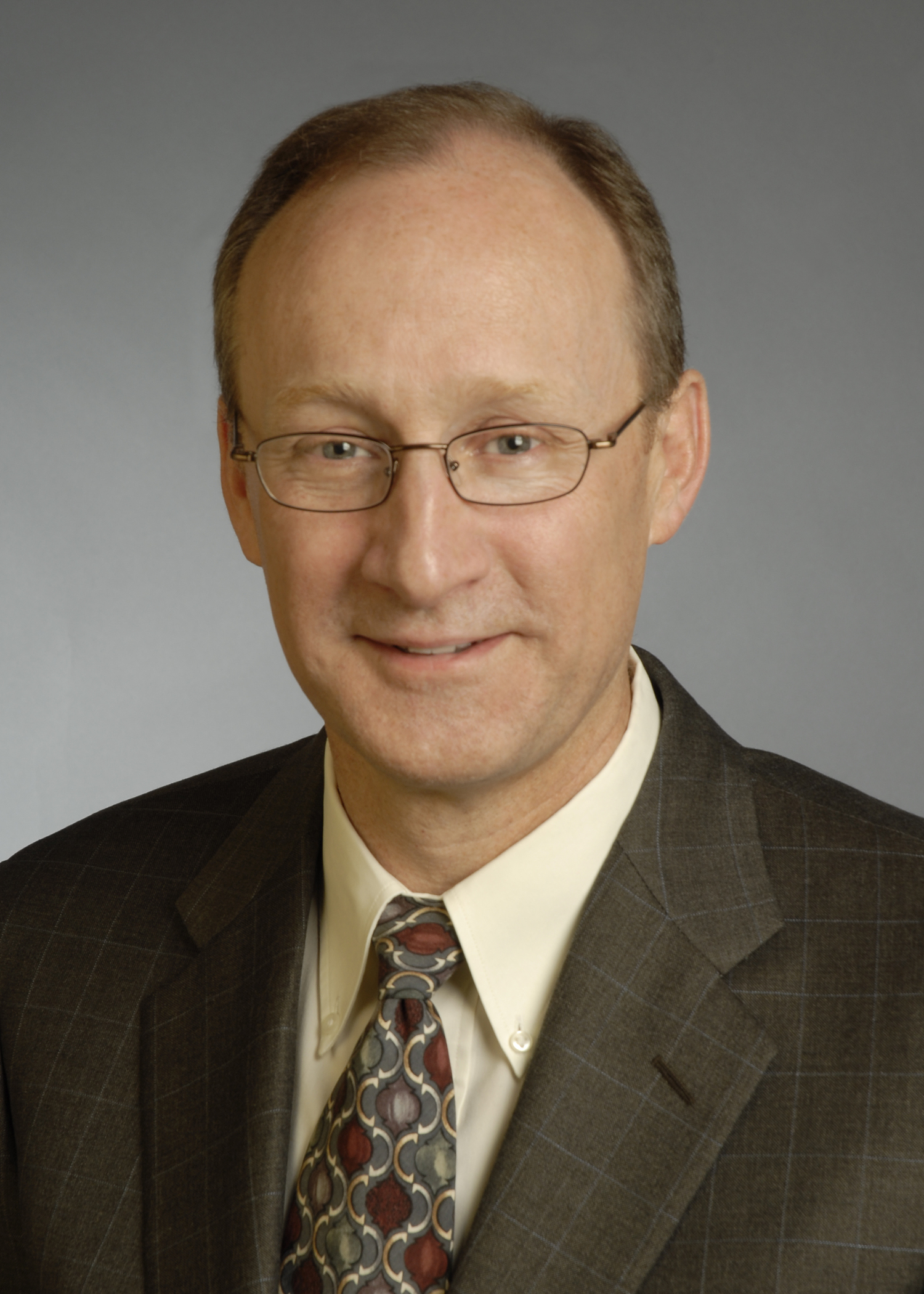
- Van Slyke in 2010
- Born: July 19, 1956 (age 70); Denver, Colorado
- Education: Ithaca College; Rochester Institute of Technology
- Known for: Development of OLED Technology
- Scientific career
- Fields: Chemistry; Materials science
- Workplaces: Eastman Kodak Company; Kateeva

Steven Van Slyke (born July 19, 1956) is an American chemist, best known for his co-invention of the Organic Light Emitting Diode (OLED) with Ching Wan Tang and his contributions to the commercial development of OLED displays. Van Slyke is currently the Chief Technology Officer Emeritus at Kateeva, Inc. Prior to joining Kateeva, he held various positions at Eastman Kodak and was involved in all aspects of OLED technology, from basic materials development to implementation of full-color OLED display manufacturing.

== Education and career ==
Steven Van Slyke received his BA degree in chemistry from Ithaca College and his MS degree in materials science from Rochester Institute of Technology. He joined Eastman Kodak in 1979 as a Research Scientist and, together with Ching W. Tang, discovered key materials and thin-film device configurations leading to the demonstration of efficient Organic Light Emitting Diode structures. As Chief Technology Officer at Kateeva, he was responsible for the implementation of proprietary ink-jet printing technologies for more efficient manufacturing of OLED displays.

Van Slyke's career at Kodak led to the discovery of new organic material and layer structures providing efficient and stable OLED devices as well as to the development of novel methods for high volume manufacturing of OLED displays. In particular, Van Slyke identified metal chelate structures that provided emission with high durability across the visible spectrum, as well as key hole transporting materials useful for providing confinement of excited states within the OLED structure. Van Slyke and his teams also developed linear deposition sources that are now used in high volume manufacturing of full color OLED displays and also introduced the RGBW (four sub-pixel) display configuration found in OLED TVs. These accomplishments are described in over 40 U.S. patents and over 50 publications and presentations in the areas of electronic materials development, device architecture and manufacturing.

At Kateeva, Van Slyke's responsibilities included the development of the company's inkjet display manufacturing technologies, with a focus on thin-film encapsulation and RGB pixel pattering of OLED displays.

== Awards ==
- 2024 – Karl Ferdinand Braun Prize of the Society for Information Display "for pioneering contributions to the field of electronic displays with the invention and development of organic light-emitting diodes (OLEDs)"
- 2019 – Photographic Society of America Progress Award "for the invention of OLED (Organic Light Emitting Diode)"
- 2018 – National Inventors Hall of Fame "in recognition of an innovation that has contributed to the nation's welfare and the progress of science and useful arts"
- 2014 – Thomson Reuters Citation Laureate "for the invention of the organic light emitting diode"
- 2013 – Consumer Electronics Hall of Fame "for pioneering work that led to the invention of the Organic Light-emitting Diode"
- 2010 – Distinguished Alumni Award, Watertown High School “for the invention of a new display technology”
- 2006 – Fellow of the Society for Information Display "for his pioneering work and many contributions to the science and technology of organic light-emitting-diode (OLED) displays"
- 2004 – Eastman Kodak Research Fellow "for extraordinary contributions to the Eastman Kodak Company"
- 2004 – American Chemical Society National Award for Team Innovation "for successfully moving an innovative idea to a product now in commercial use"
- 2003 – Eastman Kodak Company Distinguished Inventors Gallery "for studies in the field of Organic Light Emitting Diodes"
- 2002 – Rochester Inventor of the Year of the Rochester Intellectual Property Law Association "for outstanding contribution to the community and to the nation by promoting progress of the useful arts through invention and the use of the patent system"
- 2001 – American Chemical Society Northeast Regional Industrial Innovation Award "for the invention and commercialization of a new display technology"
- 2001 – Jan Rajchman Prize of the Society for Information Display "for pioneering contributions to the underlying science and technology of organic light-emitting diodes that lead to the commercialization of flat-panel OLED displays"
- 2000 – Eastman Innovation Award, Eastman Kodak Company's highest award "in recognition of extraordinary innovative contributions leading to business success for Eastman Kodak Company"

== Selected publications ==
- Spindler, J. P.; Hatwar, T. K.; Miller, M. E.; Arnold, A. D.; Murdoch, M. J.; Kane, P. J.; Ludwicki, J. E.; Alessi, P. J.; Van Slyke, S. A. (2006). "System considerations for RGBW OLED displays". Journal of the Society for Information Display. 14 (1): 37–48. doi:10.1889/1.2166833. S2CID 54700061.
- Van Slyke, S. A.; Pignata, A.; Freeman, D.; Redden, N.; Waters, D.; Negishi, T.; Kanno, H.; Nishio, Y.; Nakai, M. (2002). "27.2: Linear Source Deposition of Organic Layers for Full-Color OLED". SID Symposium Digest of Technical Papers. 33 (1): 886–889. doi:10.1889/1.1830925. S2CID 136959640.
- Van Slyke, S. A.; Tang, C. W. (1996). Blue emitting organic electroluminescent devices. Proc. 8th Int. Workshop on Inorganic and Organic Electroluminescence. Berlin, Germany.
- Van Slyke, S. A.; Chen, C. H.; Tang, C. W. (1996). "Organic electroluminescent devices with improved stability". Applied Physics Letters. 69 (15): 2160–2162. Bibcode:1996ApPhL..69.2160V. doi:10.1063/1.117151.
- Tang, C. W.; Van Slyke, S. A.; Chen, C. H. (1989). "Electroluminescence of doped organic thin films". Journal of Applied Physics. 65 (9): 3610–3616. Bibcode:1989JAP....65.3610T. doi:10.1063/1.343409.
- Tang, C. W.; Van Slyke, S. A. (1987). "Organic electroluminescent diodes". Applied Physics Letters. 51 (12): 913–915. Bibcode:1987ApPhL..51..913T. doi:10.1063/1.98799.
