= Takehisa Yaegashi =

- Born: 1943 (age 82–83)
- Education: Hokkaido University
- Engineering career
- Significant design: Toyota Prius; Hybrid Synergy Drive

Takehisa Yaegashi (born 1943) is a retired engineer for Toyota Motor Corporation. He led the team that developed the Prius and, though retired, still works as a consultant for Toyota. He is known as "Mr. Hybrid."
