= Peter C. Schultz =

American academic

Peter C. Schultz (born 1942) is an American academic who is co-inventor of the fiber optics used for telecommunications. He is a retired president (1988–2001) of Heraeus Tenevo Inc., a technical glass manufacturer specializing in fiber optics and semiconductor markets, and retired chief technical officer North America for Heraeus Holding GmbH. In 2001, he was elected a member of the National Academy of Engineering for invention and development of manufacturing methods and glass compositions for low-attenuation glass fibers for optical communication.

== Biography ==
Schultz was born in 1942 in Brooklyn to a Czech-American mother and German-American father. He graduated in 1960 from Scotch Plains-Fanwood High School in Union County, New Jersey. He attended Rutgers University, where he earned a BS in Engineering.

He and his wife Mary Anne are residents of St. Thomas, US Virgin Islands. They have four children.

== Career ==
He has taught at Cornell University (visiting professor, Materials Science 1978–1984), George Washington University (Continuing Engineering Program professor 1976–1994) and University of Virginia (visiting professor of Darden School 1988–1998).

Since 2001 he has provided consulting services to several companies (including Intel, SEMATECH International, Yazaki, Furukawa, IMRA and SPI Lasers plc) and has been an expert witness for several law firms, through Peter Schultz Consulting, LLC. He serves as senior advisor and board member of OFS (the Lucent fiber optics business unit acquired by Furukawa in 2001). He also serves as a board member of CBN Connect Inc., a non-profit company providing an open access broadband fiber-to-the-home system to the Adirondack region of New York.

He is also president of a start-up company (BioSensor Inc., founded in 1997) developing a non-invasive fiber optic sensor to measure blood glucose for diabetics, based on Russian technology. He is a member of the Selection Committee for the National Medal of Technology and a board member of the National Inventors Hall of Fame.

Schultz holds 26 patents, has written over 20 research papers, and is an expert in fused silica glasses.

== Awards and honors ==
In 1993 he was inducted into the National Inventors Hall of Fame, and in 2000 he received the National Medal of Technology from U.S. President Bill Clinton for this accomplishment (the highest technology award of the US government). He was elected a member of the National Academy of Engineering in 2001.

He is the recipient of the International Glass Science Award (1977), SPIE Technology Achievement Award (1981), ASM Engineering Materials Achievement Award (1983), First American Innovators Award (US Dept. of Commerce 1995), Rutgers University Distinguished Alumni (2000), and the Czech Gold Medal for Achievement (President Havel 2002). He is a fellow of the American Ceramic Society.
