= List of members of the National Academy of Engineering (electronics) =

This list is a subsection of the List of members of the National Academy of Engineering, which includes members and international members of the United States National Academy of Engineering, living and deceased, each affiliated with one of the academy's disciplinary sections. Members are listed under their primary section, and each entry gives the person's name, primary institution, and election year. For deceased members, the year of death is noted.

== Electronics, Communication and Information Systems ==
Name	Affiliation	Year elected
M. Robert Aaron (died 2007)	Contemplating Consulting	1979
Asad A. Abidi	University of California, Los Angeles	2007
Robert W. Adams	Analog Devices, Inc.	2018
Willis A. Adcock (died 2003)	The University of Texas at Austin	1974
Ilesanmi Adesida	Nazarbayev University	2006
Robert Adler (died 2007)	Independent Consultant	1967
Nasir Ahmed	The University of New Mexico	2026
Pierre R. Aigrain (died 2002)	No Affiliation	1976
Isamu Akasaki (died 2021)	Meijo University	2008
Nicolaos G. Alexopoulos	Broadcom Corporation	2007
Rod C. Alferness	University of California, Santa Barbara	2003
Zhores I. Alfërov (died 2019)	St. Petersburg Academic University	1990
Jan P. Allebach	Purdue University	2014
Mark G. Allen	University of Pennsylvania	2023
David J. Allstot	Carnegie Mellon University	2020
Mohamed-Slim Khemais Alouini	King Abdullah University of Science and Technology (KAUST)	2026
Hiroshi Amano	Nagoya University	2016
Mukesh Dhirubhai Ambani	Reliance Industries Ltd.	2016
Brian D.O. Anderson	Australian National University	2002
Dana Zachary Anderson	Infleqtion	2026
Frederick T. Andrews (died 2013)	Telcordia Technologies, Inc.	1988
Dimitri A. Antoniadis	Massachusetts Institute of Technology	2006
Maurice Apstein (died 1987)	The George Washington University	1977
Yasuhiko Arakawa	The University of Tokyo	2017
Peter M. Asbeck	University of California, San Diego	2007
Eric Ash (died 2021)	Imperial College London	2001
Arthur Ashkin (died 2020)	Bell Labs	1984
Karl J. Astrom	Lund University	1995
Isaac L. Auerbach (died 1992)	Auerbach Consultants	1974
David H. Auston	University of California, Santa Barbara	1989
David D. Awschalom	The University of Chicago	2011
Marc A. Baldo	Massachusetts Institute of Technology	2024
B. Jayant Baliga	North Carolina State University	1993
Richard Baraniuk	Rice University	2022
Edward J. Barlow (died 2010)	Varian Associates, Inc.	1968
Harold E. M. Barlow (died 1989)	University College London	1979
David K. Barton (died 2023)	Independent Consultant	1997
Tamer Basar	University of Illinois Urbana-Champaign	2000
Andreas von Bechtolsheim	Arista Networks, Inc.	2000
Neal S. Bergano	TE SubCom	2016
Toby Berger (died 2022)	University of Virginia	2006
Dimitri P. Bertsekas	Massachusetts Institute of Technology	2001
Rajaram Bhat	Corning Incorporated	2026
Pallab K. Bhattacharya	University of Michigan	2008
James R. Biard (died 2022)	Independent Consultant	1991
Dieter Bimberg	CIOMP	2014
David J. Bishop	Boston University	2019
Richard E. Blahut	University of Illinois Urbana-Champaign	1990
Franklin H. Blecher (died 2012)	AT&T Bell Laboratories	1979
Nicolaas Bloembergen (died 2017)	University of Arizona	1984
Andrew H. Bobeck (died 2017)	AT&T Bell Laboratories	1975
Mark T. Bohr	Intel Corporation	2005
David E. Borth	Motorola, Inc.	2004
Amar G. Bose (died 2013)	Bose Corporation	1987
Alan Conrad Bovik	University of Colorado Boulder	2022
Edward G. Bowen (died 1991)	Commonwealth Scientific and Industrial Research Organization	1977
Robert W. Bower (died 2024)	University of California, Davis	1999
John Edward Bowers	University of California, Santa Barbara	2005
Klaus D. Bowers (died 2022)	AT&T Bell Laboratories	1985
Sidney A. Bowhill (died 2012)	University of Illinois Urbana-Champaign	1971
Stephen P. Boyd	Stanford University	2014
Willard S. Boyle (died 2011)	AT&T Bell Laboratories	1974
Robert K. Brayton (died 2025)	University of California, Berkeley	1993
William B. Bridges (died 2024)	California Institute of Technology	1977
Robert D. Briskman	Telecommunications Engineering Consultants	2014
Roger W. Brockett (died 2023)	Harvard University	1991
Robert W. Brodersen (died 2024)	University of California, Berkeley	1988
Alec N. Broers	House of Lords	1994
Burton P. Brown (died 2004)	General Electric Company	1973
Julia J. Brown	Universal Display Corporation	2021
William M. Brown (died 2008)	Air Force Research Laboratory	1992
Per V. Bruel (died 2015)	Bruel Acoustics	1979
John H. Bruning	Corning Tropel Corporation	1998
J. Fred Bucy (died 2021)	Independent Consultant	1974
Robert D. Burnham (died 2023)	Phoenix Photonix Inc.	1990
Robert L. Byer	Stanford University	1987
Cleopatra Cabuz	Honeywell Industrial Safety	2017
Giuseppe Caire	Technische Universität Berlin	2026
A. Robert Calderbank	Duke University	2005
Joe Charles Campbell	University of Virginia	2002
Federico Capasso	Harvard University	1995
James E. Carnes	Sarnoff Corporation	1996
Hendrik B. G. Casimir (died 2000)	Leiden University	1976
Zoltan J. Cendes	Carnegie Mellon University	2021
Anantha P. Chandrakasan	Massachusetts Institute of Technology	2015
Chun-Yen Chang (died 2018)	National Chiao Tung University	2000
Leroy L. Chang (died 2008)	The Hong Kong University of Science and Technology	1988
Mau-Chung Frank Chang	University of California, Los Angeles	2008
Morris Chang	Taiwan Semiconductor Manufacturing Co., Ltd.	2002
Shih-Fu Chang	Columbia University	2023
Constance Chang-Hasnain	Berxel Photonics Co. Ltd.	2018
Pallab K. Chatterjee	Symphony Technologies Group	1997
Robert S. Chau	Intel Corporation	2013
Ramalingam Chellappa	Johns Hopkins University	2023
Young-Kai Chen (died 2026)	Coherent Corporation	2004
Weng Cho Chew	Purdue University	2013
Mung Chiang	Purdue University	2026
Daeje Chin	Skylake Investment Company	2020
Donald A. Chisholm (died 2004)	Northern Telecom Limited	1986
Alfred Y. Cho	Nokia Bell Labs	1985
Marvin Chodorow (died 2005)	Stanford University	1967
Stephen Y. Chou	Princeton University	2007
Sunlin Chou (died 2018)	Intel Corporation	2004
Andrew R. Chraplyvy	Nokia Bell Labs	2002
John M. Cioffi	Stanford University	2001
Dayton H. Clewell (died 1992)	Mobil Corporation	1976
John Maxwell Cohn	MIT-IBM Watson AI Lab	2022
Nathan Cohn (died 1989)	Network Systems Development Associates	1969
Seymour B. Cohn (died 2015)	S.B. Cohn Associates	1991
Larry A. Coldren	University of California, Santa Barbara	2004
James J. Coleman	University of Illinois Urbana-Champaign	2012
Robert E. Collin (died 2010)	Case Western Reserve University	1990
John W. Coltman (died 2010)	Westinghouse Electric Corporation	1976
Tony George Constantinides	Imperial College London	2024
Esther M. Conwell (died 2014)	University of Rochester	1980
Martin Cooper	Dyna, LLC	2010
Thomas M. Cover (died 2012)	Stanford University	1995
Donald C. Cox	Stanford University	1994
Magnus George Craford	LumiLeds Lighting	1994
Cullen M. Crain (died 1998)	The RAND Corporation	1980
Dale L. Critchlow (died 2016)	International Business Machines Corporation	1991
Douglass D. Crombie (died 2011)	The Aerospace Corporation	1980
Jose B. Cruz Jr.	The Ohio State University	1980
Malcolm R. Currie (died 2021)	Hughes Aircraft Company	1971
C. Chapin Cutler (died 2002)	Stanford University	1970
Leonard S. Cutler (died 2006)	Agilent Technologies	1987
George C. Dacey (died 2010)	Sandia National Laboratories	1973
Mark David Dankberg	ViaSat Inc.	2017
Paul Daniel Dapkus	University of Southern California	2004
Sidney Darlington (died 1997)	University of New Hampshire	1975
Supriyo Datta	Purdue University	2012
Bijan Davari	IBM Thomas J. Watson Research Center	2014
Wilbur B. Davenport Jr. (died 2003)	Massachusetts Institute of Technology	1975
Edward Joseph Davison	University of Toronto	2010
Aart J. de Geus	Synopsys, Inc.	2019
Peter J. Delfyett Jr.	University of Central Florida	2021
Anthony J. DeMaria (died 2025)	Coherent - DEOS, LLC	1976
Zhonghan John Deng	Zhongxing Microelectronics Company Ltd.	2020
Robert H. Dennard (died 2024)	IBM Thomas J. Watson Research Center	1984
Georges A. Deschamps (died 1998)	University of Illinois Urbana-Champaign	1978
Charles A. Desoer (died 2010)	University of California, Berkeley	1977
Anirudh Devgan	Cadence Design Systems, Inc.	2023
Alton C. Dickieson (died 2000)	AT&T Bell Laboratories	1970
Scott Alan Diddams	University of Colorado Boulder	2025
Frederick H. Dill	Hitachi Global Storage Technologies	1990
Stephen W. Director	Northeastern University	1989
Dariush D. Divsalar	NASA Jet Propulsion Laboratory, Caltech	2024
Christopher R. Doerr	Aloe Semiconductor, Inc.	2025
Nicholas M. Donofrio	NMD Consulting, LLC	1995
Irwin Dorros (died 2019)	Dorros Associates	1990
Mildred S. Dresselhaus (died 2017)	Massachusetts Institute of Technology	1974
Charles B. Duke (died 2019)	Xerox Corporation	1993
Russell D. Dupuis	Georgia Institute of Technology	1989
Tariq S. Durrani	University of Strathclyde	2018
Robert W. Dutton	Stanford University	1991
Dean E. Eastman (died 2018)	The University of Chicago	1988
Lester F. Eastman (died 2013)	Cornell University	1986
Harold E. Edgerton (died 1990)	Massachusetts Institute of Technology	1966
Youssef A. El-Mansy	Intel	2026
George Eleftheriades	University of Toronto	2026
Evangelos Eleftheriou	IBM Zurich Research Laboratory	2018
Peter Elias (died 2001)	Massachusetts Institute of Technology	1979
Robert S. Elliott (died 2009)	University of California, Los Angeles	1988
Charles H. Elmendorf III (died 2010)	AT&T Corporation	1971
James C. Elms (died 1993)	Strategic Defense Initiative Organization	1974
Julie Sheridan Eng	Coherent	2025
Per Kristian Enge (died 2018)	Stanford University	2005
Joel S. Engel	JSE Consulting	1996
Nader Engheta	University of Pennsylvania	2026
Thomas J. Engibous	Texas Instruments Incorporated	2003
Leo Esaki	The Science and Technology Promotion Foundation of Ibaraki	1977
Von R. Eshleman (died 2017)	Stanford University	1978
Michael Ettenberg	Dolce Technologies	2000
Delores M. Etter (died 2026)	Southern Methodist University	2000
John V. Evans	COMSAT Corporation	1984
Thomas E. Everhart	California Institute of Technology	1978
Jerome Faist	ETH Zurich	2022
Shanhui Fan	Stanford University	2024
Frank F. Fang	IBM Thomas J. Watson Research Center	1989
Gunnar Fant (died 2009)	KTH-Royal Institute of Technology	1982
Alfonso Farina	Leonardo S.p.A.	2023
Joseph Feinstein (died 2014)	Stanford University	1976
Leopold B. Felsen (died 2005)	Boston University	1977
Gerhard Paul Fettweis	Technical University of Dresden	2024
Lester M. Field (died 1997)	Hughes Aircraft Company	1967
Donald G. Fink (died 1996)	Institute of Electrical and Electronics Engineers	1969
James L. Flanagan (died 2015)	Rutgers University–New Brunswick	1978
James C. Fletcher (died 1991)	University of Pittsburgh	1970
Robert E. Fontana Jr.	IBM Almaden Research Center	2002
G. David Forney Jr.	Massachusetts Institute of Technology	1983
Stephen R. Forrest	University of Michigan	2003
Gerard J. Foschini (died 2023)	Bell Labs, Alcatel-Lucent	2009
Eric R. Fossum	Dartmouth College	2013
Alan B. Fowler (died 2024)	No Affiliation	1990
Charles A. Fowler (died 2016)	C.A. Fowler Associates	1985
Edward H. Frank	Gradient Technologies	2018
Gene Alan Frantz	Octavo Systems, LLC	2020
Judson C. French (died 2021)	National Institute of Standards and Technology	1990
Richard H. Frenkiel	Rutgers University–New Brunswick	1997
Eugene G. Fubini (died 1997)	E.G. Fubini Consultants, Limited	1966
Robert Q. Fugate	New Mexico Institute of Mining and Technology	2003
James G. Fujimoto	Massachusetts Institute of Technology	2001
Robert G. Gallager	Massachusetts Institute of Technology	1979
John K. Galt (died 2003)	AT&T Bell Laboratories	1986
Robert W. Galvin (died 2011)	Motorola, Inc.	2002
Abbas El Gamal	Stanford University	2013
Elsa M. Garmire	U.S. Department of State	1989
Patrick Paul Gelsinger	Intel Corporation	2023
Tahir Ghani	Intel Corporation	2015
Thomas G. Giallorenzi	U.S. Naval Research Laboratory-Washington, D.C.	1992
Thomas Robert Giallorenzi	L3Harris Technologies	2020
James F. Gibbons	Stanford University	1974
Barrie Gilbert (died 2020)	Analog Devices, Inc.	2009
Elmer G. Gilbert (died 2019)	University of Michigan	1994
Clinton Randy Giles	Center for the Advancement of Science in Space (CASIS)	2010
Edward L. Ginzton (died 1998)	Varian Associates, Inc.	1965
Bernd Girod	Stanford University	2015
Richard D. Gitlin	University of South Florida	2005
Edward L. Glaser (died 1990)	Nucleus International Corporation	1977
Alan H. Gnauck	Nokia Bell Labs	2012
Andrea Goldsmith	Stony Brook University	2017
Solomon W. Golomb (died 2016)	University of Southern California	1976
David J. Goodman	New York University	2006
Joseph W. Goodman	Stanford University	1987
Bernard M. Gordon	BMG Charitable Trust	1991
Eugene I. Gordon (died 2014)	Germgard Lighting LLC	1979
James P. Gordon (died 2013)	Lucent Technologies	1985
William E. Gordon (died 2010)	No Affiliation	1975
Roy W. Gould (died 2022)	California Institute of Technology	1971
John V. N. Granger (died 1997)	Independent Consultant	1975
Paul E. Gray (died 2017)	Massachusetts Institute of Technology	1975
Paul R. Gray	University of California, Berkeley	1990
Robert Molten Gray	Stanford University	2007
Martin A. Green	University of New South Wales	2023
Paul Eliot Green Jr. (died 2018)	Tellabs, Inc.	1981
Andrew S. Grove (died 2016)	Intel Corporation	1979
Hermann K. Gummel (died 2022)	Independent Consultant	1985
Robert W. Gundlach (died 2010)	Xerox Corporation	1994
John B. Gunn (died 2008)	International Business Machines Corporation	1978
George I. Haddad	University of Michigan	1994
Jerrier A. Haddad (died 2017)	International Business Machines Corporation	1968
Susan Carol Hagness	University of Wisconsin-Madison	2026
Bruce Hajek	University of Illinois Urbana-Champaign	1999
Robert N. Hall (died 2016)	General Electric Company	1977
Donald L. Hammond (died 2021)	Hewlett-Packard Company	1987
John C. Hancock	Independent Consultant	1974
Robert C. Hansen (died 2018)	R.C. Hansen Inc.	1992
Eliyahou Harari	SanDisk Corporation	2013
James S. Harris	Stanford University	2011
Stephen E. Harris	Stanford University	1977
Douglass C. Harvey (died 2008)	Eastman Kodak Company	1981
Mehdi Hatamian	Florida International University	2016
Michael Hatzakis (died 2023)	Institute of Microelectronics	1989
Hermann A. Haus (died 2003)	Massachusetts Institute of Technology	1976
Robert Wendell Heath Jr.	University of California, San Diego	2025
Alan J. Heeger	University of California, Santa Barbara	2002
George H. Heilmeier (died 2014)	Telcordia Technologies, Inc.	1979
Martin E. Hellman	Stanford University	2002
Robert W. Hellwarth (died 2021)	University of Southern California	1977
Jonathan Paul Heritage	University of California, Davis	2019
Donald R. Herriott (died 2007)	AT&T Bell Laboratories	1982
S. W. Herwald (died 1998)	Westinghouse Electric Corporation	1967
Karl Hess	University of Illinois Urbana-Champaign	2001
William R. Hewlett (died 2001)	Hewlett-Packard Company	1965
Cyril Hilsum (died 2026)	Independent Consultant	1983
William C. Hittinger (died 2013)	Independent Consultant	1976
Yu-Chi Ho	Harvard University	1987
David A. Hodges (died 2022)	University of California, Berkeley	1983
C. Lester Hogan (died 2008)	Fairchild Semiconductor Corporation	1977
David C. Hogg (died 2009)	AT&T Bell Laboratories	1978
D. Brainerd Holmes (died 2013)	Raytheon Company	1977
Nick Holonyak Jr. (died 2022)	University of Illinois Urbana-Champaign	1973
Larry J. Hornbeck	The University of Texas at Dallas	2007
Richard R. Hough (died 1992)	AT&T Corporation	1983
H. Taylor Howard (died 2002)	Stanford University	1997
William G. Howard Jr.	Independent Consultant	1985
Roger T. Howe	Stanford University	2005
J. Jim Hsieh	Sheaumann Laser Inc.	2015
Ming Hsieh	Fulgent Genetics	2015
Chenming Hu	University of California, Berkeley	1997
Evelyn L. Hu	Harvard University	2002
Thomas S. Huang (died 2020)	University of Illinois Urbana-Champaign	2001
Yidong Huang	Tsinghua University	2024
Kenichi Iga	Tokyo Institute of Technology	2007
Kees Schouhamer Immink	Turing Machines, Inc.	2007
Fritz Ingerslev (died 1994)	Technical University of Denmark	1982
Hiroshi Inose (died 2000)	National Institute of Informatics	1985
Erich P. Ippen	Massachusetts Institute of Technology	1985
Waguih S. Ishak	Stanford University	2022
Akira Ishimaru (died 2025)	University of Washington	1996
Tatsuo Itoh (died 2021)	University of California, Los Angeles	2003
Shirley Ann Jackson	Rensselaer Polytechnic Institute	2001
Irwin M. Jacobs	Qualcomm Incorporated	1982
John E. Jacobs (died 2008)	Northwestern University - Evanston	1969
Chennupati Jagadish	Australian National University	2020
Kanti Jain	University of Illinois Urbana-Champaign	2009
Charles V. Jakowatz Jr. (died 2015)	Sandia National Laboratories	2003
Bahram Jalali	University of California, Los Angeles	2022
Nikil S. Jayant	Georgia Institute of Technology	1996
Sanjay Kumar Jha	Retired-Other	2018
Amos E. Joel Jr. (died 2008)	Bell Labs, Lucent Technologies	1981
Barry C. Johnson	Villanova University	2001
H. Richard Johnson (died 2012)	Watkins-Johnson Company	1973
Kristina M. Johnson	Johnson Energy Holdings, LLC	2016
Howard S. Jones Jr. (died 2005)	Independent Consultant	1999
Angel G. Jordan (died 2017)	Carnegie Mellon University	1986
Biing-Hwang Juang	Georgia Institute of Technology	2004
Thomas Kailath	Stanford University	1984
Mohan Kalkunte	Broadcom Inc.	2025
Rudolf Kalman (died 2016)	ETH Zurich	1991
Ivan P. Kaminow (died 2013)	University of California, Berkeley	1984
Hisashi Kaneko (died 2020)	NEC Corporation	1997
Charles K. Kao (died 2018)	The Chinese University of Hong Kong	1990
Min H. Kao	Garmin Ltd.	2011
Linda P.B. Katehi	Texas A&M University-College Station	2006
Lydia E. Kavraki	Rice University	2025
Donald B. Keck	University of South Florida	1993
Joseph F. Keithley (died 1999)	Keithley Instruments, Inc.	1992
Ursula Keller	ETH Zurich	2026
Thomas W. Kenny	Stanford University	2022
Robert W. Keyes (died 2010)	IBM Thomas J. Watson Research Center	1976
Makoto Kikuchi (died 2012)	Tokai University	1987
Jack S. Kilby (died 2005)	Independent Consultant	1967
Kinam Kim	Samsung Electronics Co., Ltd.	2012
Robert H. Kingston	Massachusetts Institute of Technology	1990
Gordon S. Kino (died 2017)	Stanford University	1976
Tobias J. Kippenberg	Swiss Federal Institute of Technology, Lausanne	2024
Frederick Anthony Kish Jr.	North Carolina State University	2014
Koji Kobayashi (died 1996)	NEC Corporation	1977
Thomas L. Koch	University of Arizona	2006
Herwig Kogelnik	Nokia Bell Labs	1978
Petar V. Kokotovic	University of California, Santa Barbara	1996
Walter F. Kosonocky (died 1996)	New Jersey Institute of Technology	1992
Robert G. Kouyoumjian (died 2011)	The Ohio State University	1995
Fumio Koyama	Institute of Science Tokyo	2025
Michael R. Krames	Arkesso, LLC	2025
John D. Kraus (died 2004)	The Ohio State University	1972
Henry Kressel	Warburg Pincus, LLC	1980
Herbert Kroemer (died 2024)	University of California, Santa Barbara	1997
Mark H. Kryder	Carnegie Mellon University	1994
Ernest S. Kuh (died 2015)	University of California, Berkeley	1975
Kelin J. Kuhn	Cornell University	2023
Panganamala Ramana Kumar	Texas A&M University-College Station	2007
John E. Kunzler (died 2006)	AT&T Bell Laboratories	1982
Anthony D. Kurtz (died 2010)	Kulite Semiconductor Products	2008
Wook Hyun Kwon	Seoul National University	2022
James M. Lafferty (died 2006)	GE Corporate Research and Development	1981
Rolf W. Landauer (died 1999)	IBM Thomas J. Watson Research Center	1978
Rajiv Laroia	Light Labs	2021
Kam Yin Lau	University of California, Berkeley	2026
Victor B. Lawrence	Stevens Institute of Technology	2003
Shung-Wu Lee	University of Illinois Urbana-Champaign	2000
Frank W. Lehan (died 1997)	Independent Consultant	1970
Emmett N. Leith (died 2005)	University of Michigan	1982
James U. Lemke (died 2019)	Achates Power, Inc.	1988
Frederick J. Leonberger	EOvation Advisors LLC	2000
Martin P. Lepselter (died 2020)	BTL Fellows Inc.	1987
Khaled Ben Letaief	The Hong Kong University of Science and Technology	2021
Marc D Levenson	No Affiliation	2005
Humboldt W. Leverenz (died 2003)	RCA Corporation	1970
Ming-Jun Li	Corning Research & Development Corporation	2018
Tingye Li (died 2012)	AT&T Labs Research	1980
Burn J. Lin	National Tsing Hua University	2008
William C. Lindsey	University of Southern California	1997
John G. Linvill (died 2011)	Stanford University	1971
Michal Lipson	Columbia University	2025
Bede Liu	Princeton University	2002
K.J. Ray Liu	Origin AI	2024
Tsu-Jae Liu	National Academy of Engineering	2017
Lennart Ljung	Linköping University	2004
Yuen Tze Lo (died 2002)	University of Illinois Urbana-Champaign	1986
Ralph A. Logan (died 2006)	AT&T Bell Laboratories	1992
Joseph C. Logue (died 2014)	IBM Thomas J. Watson Research Center	1983
Nicky C.C. Lu	Etron Technology, Inc.	1999
Michael George Luby	Qualcomm Incorporated	2014
Robert W. Lucky (died 2022)	Telcordia Technologies, Inc.	1978
David G. Luenberger	Stanford University	2008
Mark S. Lundstrom	Purdue University	2009
Tso-Ping Ma (died 2021)	Yale University	2003
J. Ross Macdonald (died 2024)	The University of North Carolina at Chapel Hill	1970
Noel C. MacDonald (died 2022)	University of California, Santa Barbara	2000
Albert Macovski	Stanford University	1988
Alfred U. MacRae (died 2023)	MacRae Technologies	2003
Asad M. Madni	BEI Technologies, Inc.	2011
Theodore H. Maiman (died 2007)	Simon Fraser University	1967
Stephane Mallat	École Normale Supérieure	2017
Enrique A. J. Marcatili (died 2021)	AT&T Bell Laboratories	1976
Nathan Marcuvitz (died 2010)	Independent Consultant	1978
David A. Markle	Independent Consultant	2004
Karl E. Martersteck	AT&T Bell Laboratories	1992
Thomas L. Martin Jr. (died 2009)	Illinois Institute of Technology	1971
Thomas Louis Marzetta	New York University Tandon School of Engineering	2020
James L. Massey (died 2013)	ETH Zurich	1991
Bill B. May (died 2016)	ARGOSystems, Inc.	1988
John S. Mayo	Bell Labs, Lucent Technologies	1979
John C. McDonald	MBX Inc.	1989
Robert J. McEliece (died 2019)	California Institute of Technology	1998
James C. McGroddy	International Business Machines Corporation	1991
Robert E. McIntosh (died 1998)	University of Massachusetts at Amherst	1997
Kenneth G. McKay (died 2010)	AT&T Bell Laboratories	1968
Brockway McMillan (died 2016)	AT&T Bell Laboratories	1969
Alan L. McWhorter (died 2018)	Massachusetts Institute of Technology	1983
Carver A. Mead	California Institute of Technology	1984
Muriel Medard	Massachusetts Institute of Technology	2020
C. Denis Mee (died 2023)	Retired-Other	1996
Sanjay Mehrotra	Micron Technology, Inc.	2022
James D. Meindl (died 2020)	Georgia Institute of Technology	1978
James R. Melcher (died 1991)	Massachusetts Institute of Technology	1982
Harry W. Mergler (died 2017)	Case Western Reserve University	1980
Sidney Metzger (died 2011)	COMSAT Corporation	1976
Bernard S. Meyerson	International Business Machines Corporation	2002
Simon Middelhoek (died 2020)	Delft University of Technology	1996
David Middleton (died 2008)	Independent Consultant	1998
James J. Mikulski	Motorola, Inc.	1997
Peyman Milanfar	Google	2026
David A.B. Miller	Stanford University	2010
R. D. Mindlin (died 1987)	Independent Consultant	1966
Umesh Mishra	University of California, Santa Barbara	2009
Debasis Mitra	Columbia University	2003
Sanjit Kumar Mitra	University of California, Santa Barbara	2003
Sanjoy K. Mitter (died 2023)	Massachusetts Institute of Technology	1988
John L. Moll (died 2011)	Hewlett-Packard Company	1974
Linn F. Mollenauer (died 2021)	Lucent Technologies	1993
Gordon E. Moore (died 2023)	Intel Corporation	1976
Walter E. Morrow Jr. (died 2017)	MIT Lincoln Laboratory	1978
A. Stephen Morse	Yale University	2002
Peter F. Moulton	MIT Lincoln Laboratory	2000
José M. F. Moura	Carnegie Mellon University	2013
Gerard A. Mourou	École Polytechnique	2002
Richard S. Muller	University of California, Berkeley	1992
Cherry A. Murray	Harvard University	2002
Radhakrishnan L. Nagarajan	Marvell Technology Inc.	2025
Klara Nahrstedt	University of Illinois Urbana-Champaign	2022
Shuji Nakamura	University of California, Santa Barbara	2003
Albert Narath (died 2023)	Lockheed Martin Corporation	1987
Venkatesh Narayanamurti	Harvard University	1992
Marshall I. Nathan	University of Minnesota, Minneapolis	1999
Richard B. Neal (died 2012)	Stanford University	1979
Andrew R. Neureuther (died 2025)	University of California, Berkeley	1995
Shouleh Nikzad	NASA's Jet Propulsion Laboratory	2026
Tak H. Ning	IBM Thomas J. Watson Research Center	1993
Jun-ichi Nishizawa (died 2018)	Tohoku University	2010
Eugene F. O'Neill (died 2003)	AT&T Bell Laboratories	1976
Charles Oatley (died 1996)	University of Cambridge	1979
William G. Oldham	University of California, Berkeley	1986
Arthur A. Oliner (died 2013)	Polytechnic Institute of NYU	1991
Gregory Hammond Olsen	GHO Ventures, LLC	2010
Jimmy K. Omura (died 2024)	Retired-Other	1997
Alan V. Oppenheim	Massachusetts Institute of Technology	1987
M. Kenneth Oshman (died 2011)	Echelon Corporation	1982
Aydogan Ozcan	University of California, Los Angeles	2025
Roberto Padovani	University of California, San Diego	2006
Mario J. Paniccia	Anello Photonics	2021
Morton B. Panish	AT&T Bell Laboratories	1986
Jacques I. Pankove (died 2016)	RCA Corporation	1986
Mark Papermaster	AMD	2025
George J. Pappas	University of Pennsylvania	2024
Thomas W. Parks (died 2020)	Cornell University	2010
Louis C. Parrillo	Parrillo Consulting, LLC	1996
C. Kumar N. Patel	QCL Systems, LLC	1978
Arogyaswami J. Paulraj	Stanford University	2006
David Neil Payne	University of Southampton	2026
R. Fabian W. Pease	Stanford University	1997
Irene C. Peden (died 2025)	University of Washington	1993
Donald O. Pederson (died 2004)	University of California, Berkeley	1974
Paul Penfield Jr. (died 2021)	Massachusetts Institute of Technology	1994
William J. Perry	Stanford University	1970
Stewart D. Personick	No Affiliation	1992
Markus V. Pessa (died 2022)	Tampere University of Technology	2006
Kurt E. Petersen	Band of Angels	2001
Samuel C. Phillips (died 1990)	TRW Inc.	1971
Dennis J. Picard (died 2019)	Raytheon Company	1990
John R. Pierce (died 2002)	Stanford University	1965
Mark R. Pinto	Dukosi Ltd.	2010
Satyan (Sam) G. Pitroda	The Pitroda Group	2016
James D. Plummer	Stanford University	1996
H. Vincent Poor	Princeton University	2001
Zorana B. Popovic	University of Colorado Boulder	2022
Robert Price (died 2008)	Independent Consultant	1985
Dalton H. Pritchard (died 2010)	RCA Corporation	1983
Robert A. Pucel (died 2025)	RCP Consultants	1994
Peter J. Pupalaikis	Nubis Communications	2024
Calvin F. Quate (died 2019)	Stanford University	1970
Jacob Rabinow (died 1999)	National Institute of Standards and Technology	1976
Yahya Rahmat-Samii	University of California, Los Angeles	2008
Bhaskar Ramamurthi	Indian Institute of Technology - Madras	2025
Theodore Scott Rappaport	New York University Tandon School of Engineering	2021
Behzad Razavi	University of California, Los Angeles	2017
Gabriel M. Rebeiz	University of California, San Diego School of Medicine	2016
Robert H. Rediker (died 2018)	Cynosure Inc.	1989
Rowland W. Redington (died 1995)	GE Corporate Research and Development	1986
Eugene D. Reed (died 2008)	Sandia National Laboratories	1971
Walden Clark Rhines	Silvaco Group, Inc.	2026
John David Rhodes	Isotek Ltd.	2005
Thomas J. Richardson	Qualcomm Incorporated	2011
Lawrence G. Roberts (died 2018)	Roberts Consulting	1978
Denis M. Robinson (died 1994)	High Voltage Engineering Corporation	1970
Ahmadreza Rofougaran	Movandi Corporation	2020
Ronald A. Rohrer	Southern Methodist University	1989
Arye Rosen	Sentrimed Inc.	2002
Walter A. Rosenblith (died 2002)	Massachusetts Institute of Technology	1973
Gerald F. Ross (died 2016)	Geospatial Systems, Inc.	1995
Ian M. Ross (died 2013)	AT&T Bell Laboratories	1973
Joseph E. Rowe (died 2002)	University of Dayton	1977
John M. Rowell	No Affiliation	1995
Victor H. Rumsey (died 2015)	University of California, San Diego	1980
Jesse E. Russell	incNetworks, Inc.	1995
Mark E. Russell	Raytheon Company	2020
Krishan K. Sabnani	Johns Hopkins University	2021
Chih-Tang Sah (died 2025)	CTSAH Associates	1986
Steven B. Sample (died 2016)	University of Southern California	1998
Henry Samueli	Broadcom Corporation	2003
Irwin W. Sandberg	The University of Texas at Austin	1981
Walter Jeremiah Sanders III	Advanced Micro Devices, Inc.	2007
Hajime Sasaki (died 2022)	NEC Corporation	2000
Ali H. Sayed	École Polytechnique Fédérale de Lausanne	2018
Jacob Wernli Schaefer (died 2002)	AT&T Bell Laboratories	1980
Ronald W. Schafer	Georgia Institute of Technology	1994
Ronald V. Schmidt (died 2022)	Independent Consultant	1994
Roland W. Schmitt (died 2017)	Rensselaer Polytechnic Institute	1978
Robert A. Scholtz	University of Southern California	2009
William F. Schreiber (died 2009)	Massachusetts Institute of Technology	1995
Manfred R. Schroeder (died 2009)	University of Gottingen	1979
Mischa Schwartz	Columbia University	1992
Donald R. Scifres	SDL Ventures, LLC	1997
H. E. D. Scovil (died 2010)	AT&T Bell Laboratories	1978
Terrence J. Sejnowski	Salk Institute for Biological Studies	2011
Tadahiro Sekimoto (died 2007)	Institute for International Socio-Economic Studies	1991
Stephen D. Senturia	Massachusetts Institute of Technology	2003
Nambirajan Seshadri	University of California, San Diego	2012
Ghavam G. Shahidi	IBM Thomas J. Watson Research Center	2015
Vladimir M. Shalaev	Purdue University	2025
Shlomo Shamai	Technion-Israel Institute of Technology	2013
Charles V. Shank	Howard Hughes Medical Institute	1983
Claude E. Shannon (died 2001)	Massachusetts Institute of Technology	1985
Herbert John Shaw (died 2006)	Stanford University	1986
Freeman D. Shepherd (died 2026)	U.S. Department of the Air Force	1999
Mark Shepherd Jr. (died 2009)	Texas Instruments Incorporated	1970
William G. Shepherd (died 2003)	University of Minnesota, Minneapolis	1969
Alan F. Shugart (died 2006)	Al Shugart International	1997
Paul H. Siegel	University of California, San Diego	2008
Anthony E. Siegman (died 2011)	Stanford University	1973
Arnold H. Silver	TRW Inc.	1992
Leonard M. Silverman (died 2025)	University of Southern California	1988
Marwan A. Simaan	University of Central Florida	2000
Henry E. Singleton (died 1999)	Singleton Group	1979
Jack M. Sipress	Sipress Associates	1998
Merrill I. Skolnik (died 2022)	U.S. Naval Research Laboratory-Washington, D.C.	1986
John Brooks Slaughter (died 2023)	University of Southern California	1982
David Slepian (died 2007)	Bell Labs, Lucent Technologies	1976
Neil J.A. Sloane	OEIS Foundation, Inc	1998
George E. Smith (died 2025)	AT&T Bell Laboratories	1983
Henry I. Smith	Massachusetts Institute of Technology	1989
Louis D. Smullin (died 2009)	Massachusetts Institute of Technology	1970
Elias Snitzer (died 2012)	Rutgers University–New Brunswick	1979
Jian Song	Chinese Academy of Engineering	2000
Morgan Sparks (died 2008)	Sandia National Laboratories	1973
William J. Spencer (died 2024)	SEMATECH	1988
James J. Spilker Jr. (died 2019)	Stanford University	1998
Joel S. Spira (died 2015)	Lutron Electronics Company, Inc.	1994
Michael Robert Splinter	WISC Partners	2017
Eugene C. Starr (died 1988)	Bonneville Power Administration	1977
Raymond S. Stata	Analog Devices, Inc.	1992
Hermann Statz (died 2020)	Independent Consultant	1991
Gunter Stein	Honeywell Inc.	1994
Charles W. Stephens (died 1990)	TRW Inc.	1985
Fred Sterzer (died 2018)	MMTC, Inc.	1983
Gregory E. Stillman (died 1999)	University of Illinois Urbana-Champaign	1985
Peter Stoica	Uppsala University	2016
Roger Hall Stolen	Clemson University	2012
Archie W. Straiton (died 2000)	The University of Texas at Austin	1976
Robert Stratton	Texas Instruments Incorporated	1994
Ben G. Streetman	The University of Texas at Austin	1987
Dwight C. Streit	University of California, Los Angeles	2001
Lisa T. Su	Advanced Micro Devices, Inc.	2018
Yasuharu Suematsu	Takayanagi Memorial Foundation	1993
C. G. Suits (died 1991)	General Electric Company	1964
Eric E. Sumner (died 1993)	Institute of Electrical and Electronics Engineers	1985
Richard M. Swanson	SunPower Corporation	2009
Jerome Swartz	Swartz Foundation	2000
George W. Swenson Jr. (died 2017)	University of Illinois Urbana-Champaign	1978
Simon M. Sze (died 2023)	National Chiao Tung University	1995
Chen-To Tai (died 2004)	University of Michigan	1987
Yu-Chong Tai	California Institute of Technology	2021
Morris Tanenbaum (died 2023)	AT&T Corporation	1972
Ching Wan Tang	University of Rochester	2006
Chung L. Tang (died 2022)	Cornell University	1986
Vahid Tarokh	Duke University	2019
Al F. Tasch Jr. (died 2004)	The University of Texas at Austin	1989
Gordon K. Teal (died 2003)	Texas Instruments Incorporated	1969
Gabor C. Temes	Oregon State University	2015
Lewis M. Terman	International Business Machines Corporation	1996
Hemant Kumar Thapar	OmniTier	2019
David A. Thompson	IBM Almaden Research Center	1988
Jerome J. Tiemann (died 2006)	GE Corporate Research and Development	1984
Ping King Tien (died 2017)	Bell Labs, Alcatel-Lucent	1975
Robert W. Tkach	Nokia Bell Labs	2009
Claire J. Tomlin	University of California, Berkeley	2019
Michael F. Tompsett	Retired-Other	2016
Gary L. Tooker	Motorola, Inc.	1996
Christofer Toumazou	Imperial College London	2021
Charles Hard Townes (died 2015)	University of California, Berkeley	1998
John R. Treichler	Raytheon Applied Signal Technology	2016
Charles R. Trimble	U.S. Global Positioning System Industry Council	1999
James J. Truchard	Truchard Ventures	2007
John G. Truxal (died 2007)	State University of New York at Stony Brook	1965
David N.C. Tse	Stanford University	2018
John N. Tsitsiklis	Massachusetts Institute of Technology	2007
Yannis Tsividis	Columbia University	2019
Daniel C. Tsui	Princeton University	2004
Rodney S. Tucker	University of Melbourne	2022
George L. Turin (died 2014)	University of California, Berkeley	1985
Michiyuki Uenohara (died 2007)	NEC Research Institute, Inc.	1985
Gottfried Ungerboeck	Broadcom Corporation	1994
Kerry J. Vahala	California Institute of Technology	2020
P. P. Vaidyanathan	California Institute of Technology	2019
Reinaldo Augusto Valenzuela	Nokia Bell Labs	2017
Luc Van den hove	Interuniversity Microelectronics Center (IMEC)	2021
Theodore Van Duzer (died 2023)	University of California, Berkeley	1997
Harry L. Van Trees (died 2022)	George Mason University	2015
M. E. Van Valkenburg (died 1997)	University of Illinois Urbana-Champaign	1973
Pravin P. Varaiya (died 2022)	University of California, Berkeley	1999
Sergio Verdú	No Affiliation	2007
Martin Vetterli	École Polytechnique Fédérale de Lausanne	2015
Oswald G. Villard Jr. (died 2004)	SRI International	1966
Andrew J. Viterbi	University of Southern California	1978
Yurii Vlasov	University of Illinois Urbana-Champaign	2021
James R. Wait (died 1998)	University of Arizona	1977
Eric A. Walker (died 1995)	The Pennsylvania State University - University Park	1964
Jack L. Walker	Independent Consultant	1996
Rabab Kreidieh Ward	University of British Columbia	2020
Dean A. Watkins (died 2014)	Watkins-Johnson Company	1968
Ernst Weber (died 1996)	PRD Electronics	1964
William M. Webster (died 2017)	RCA Corporation	1976
Paul K. Weimer (died 2005)	RCA Corporation	1981
Andrew M. Weiner (died 2024)	Purdue University	2008
Max T. Weiss (died 2006)	Northrop Grumman Corporation	1986
Irwin Welber (died 2016)	Sandia National Laboratories	1988
David Fairbanks Welch	AttoTude	2016
Lloyd R. Welch (died 2023)	University of Southern California	1979
Harold A. Wheeler (died 1996)	Hazeltine Corporation	1986
John R. Whinnery (died 2009)	University of California, Berkeley	1965
Marvin H. White	The Ohio State University	2001
Richard M. White (died 2020)	University of California, Berkeley	1994
H. Kumar Wickramasinghe	University of California, Irvine	1998
Bernard Widrow (died 2025)	Stanford University	1995
Janusz S. Wilczynski (died 2024)	No Affiliation	1987
Alan Eli Willner	University of Southern California	2016
Alan S. Willsky	Massachusetts Institute of Technology	2010
Alan N. Willson Jr.	University of California, Los Angeles	2014
Donald R. Wilton	University of Houston	2021
Jack Harriman Winters	Lockheed Martin Corporation	2024
Peter J. Winzer	Nubis Communications	2017
Kensall D. Wise	University of Michigan	1998
Jack Keil Wolf (died 2011)	University of California, San Diego	1993
Charles M. Wolfe (died 2008)	Washington University	1991
Eugene Wong	University of California, Berkeley	1987
H.-S. Philip Wong	Stanford University	2026
Walter M. Wonham (died 2023)	University of Toronto	2005
Jerry M. Woodall	University of California, Davis	1989
Aaron Wyner (died 1997)	Bell Labs, Lucent Technologies	1994
Eli Yablonovitch	University of California, Berkeley	2003
Xi Yao	Xian Jiaotong University	2007
Amnon Yariv	California Institute of Technology	1976
Dante C. Youla (died 2021)	New York University	1982
John A. Young (died 2025)	Hewlett-Packard Company	1991
Leo C. Young (died 2006)	Independent Consultant	1999
Douglas C.H. Yu	Taiwan Semiconductor Manufacturing Co., Ltd.	2023
Moshe Zakai (died 2015)	Technion-Israel Institute of Technology	1989
Nikolay I. Zheludev	University of Southampton	2019
Aldert van der Ziel (died 1991)	University of Minnesota	1978
Jacob Ziv (died 2023)	Technion-Israel Institute of Technology	1988
