= Julia Phillips (physicist) =

American physicist

Julia M. Phillips
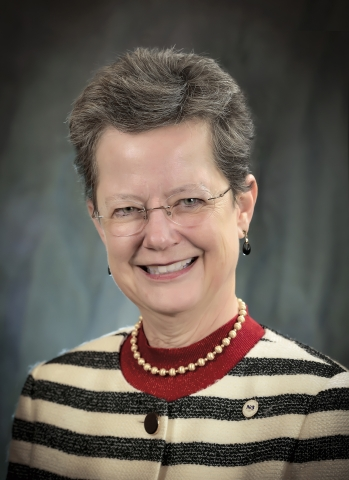
- April 2020
- Born: August 17, 1954 (age 72); Freeport, Illinois
- Education: College of William & Mary (BS); Yale University (PhD)
- Known for: Materials science; Science policy
- Awards: George E. Pake Prize
- Scientific career
- Fields: Physics
- Workplaces: Bell Labs; Sandia National Laboratories
- Thesis: Electronic excitation of helium and krypton by electron impact (1981)
- Doctoral advisor: Shek-Fu Wong

Julia Mae Phillips (born August 17, 1954) is an American physicist. She began her career in materials research on thin films on semiconductors and has transitioned into leadership roles in science policy. She currently serves on the National Science Board.

== Early life and education ==
Phillips was born in 1954 in Freeport, Illinois. Her father and grandfathers were doctors. Growing up in a rural area, she often went out stargazing. When she was in fifth grade, a teacher showed her how to triangulate to calculate distances, which further motivated her to study astronomy. Her mother was supportive and bought Phillips and her brother science kits. Phillips found the quantitative and objective nature of science appealing. She graduated from Freeport High School in 1972 as valedictorian.

She completed an undergraduate degree in physics at the College of William & Mary in 1976. Her undergraduate honors thesis was entitled Neutral differential cross section measurements in collisions of cl ̄with the rare gases. She was mentored by John Delos.

Phillips went on to complete a master's and PhD at Yale University. Shortly before completing her PhD, Phillips's supervisor had a nervous breakdown, which was a lesson to Phillips in reaching out for assistance when needed. Her 1981 doctoral thesis was on the topic of Electronic excitation of helium and krypton by electron impact.

== Career ==
Phillips worked at Bell Labs starting in 1981. She has noted that the environment at Bell Labs was excellent for research freedom and collaboration and could be a model for new research centers. She was a member of the technical staff until 1988 when was promoted to a supervisor role.

Phillips researched thin film epitaxial materials and oxides on semiconductors for potential electronics applications. She dubbed this work "lunatic fringe molecular beam epitaxy". She also contributed to high-temperature superconductors and transparent conducting materials.

In 1995, she joined Sandia National Laboratories and in 2001, she became a Director of the Sandia Physical, Chemical, and Nano Sciences Center. Between 2005 and 2007, she was also a Director of the Center for Integrated Nanotechnologies (CINT). Phillips's last role at Sandia was as Vice President and Chief Technology Officer. She retired in 2015, though remains an Emeritus Director. In New Mexico, Phillips was a major figure in the nanotechnology industry and advised the governor's office on how to foster tech start-ups and interest students in science careers. She has been praised for her energy and commitment to high-quality research with a positive, long-term impact. She managed 180 people and a budget over $45 million.

In 2016, Phillips was appointed to the National Science Board by President Barack Obama on a six year term. This role involves advising the National Science Foundation and the president on matters related to science policy and innovation in the United States. Phillips was excited to take on the responsibility and ensure that scientific research in the US remains of a high caliber.

In 2020, Phillips became a President’s Distinguished Scholar at the University of Vermont, a mentorship role to support leadership and technology transfer. She is a proponent of interdisciplinary materials research to solve problems related to energy, sustainability and medicine. She believes that a variety of perspectives and domains of expertise will lead to new breakthroughs. Phillips serves on the External Advisory Board of MIT's Materials Research Laboratory.

Phillips has chaired the American Physical Society (APS) Division of Condensed Matter Physics and served as president of the Materials Research Society in 1995. She has been an editor for numerous physics journals including Applied Physics Letters, Journal of Applied Physics, Applied Physics Reviews, and Journal of Materials Research. She holds five patents. From 2016 to 2020, she was Home Secretary of the National Academy of Engineering. She is a founding member of Expert Connect.

== Awards and honours ==
- 2019 5 Sigma Physicist Award from the American Physical Society for her work as an advocate for reducing nuclear risk.
- 2018 Inductee, Albert Nelson Marquis Lifetime Achievement.
- 2016 Appointment to the National Science Board.
- 2010 Fellow of the Materials Research Society.
- 2008 George E. Pake Prize for her leadership and pioneering research in materials physics for industrial and national security applications.
- 2005 Member of the American Academy of Arts and Sciences.
- 2004 Member of the National Academy of Engineering for leadership and distinguished research in the epitaxy of dissimilar materials.
- 2004 Wilbur Cross Medal.
- 2002 Fellow of the American Association for the Advancement of Science.
- 2002 Horizon Award from the US Department of Labor Women's Bureau.
- 1996 Materials Research Society Woody Award.
- 1993 Fellow of the American Physical Society for her contributions to the understanding of the growth mechanisms and properties of epitaxial heterostructures involving structurally and electrically dissimilar materials.

== Personal life ==
In 1989, Phillips married a now-retired neurophysiologist, John A. Connor. Phillips and her husband are both musicians. She plays the flute and he plays the piano. The couple had two daughters. One daughter, Julia Connor, is a violinist while the other, Bridget Connor, is a chemist.
