= Andrew Weiner =

Andrew Weiner may refer to:

- Andrew Weiner (writer) (1949–2019), Canadian writer
- Andrew M. Weiner, American electrical engineer
