= Morris D. Hooven =

American electrical engineer

- Born: 30 May 1897; Weatherly, Pennsylvania
- Died: 10 October 1976 (aged 79); Montclair Town, Essex, New Jersey
- Education: Bucknell University
- Occupation: Electrical Engineer
- Awards: IEEE Founders Medal
- Scientific career
- Fields: Electrical Engineering
- Workplaces: Westinghouse Electric

Morris Daniel Hooven (30 May 1897 – 10 October 1976) was an American electrical engineer, researcher and businessman.

== Early life and education ==
Hooven was born on 30 May 1897 in Weatherly, Pennsylvania. His father was Morris Davis Hooven and his mother was Laura Emma Rouse.

Hooven graduated in 1914 from Turtle Creek High School in the Pittsburgh area. In 1920, he received a B.S. degree magna cum laude from Bucknell University.

== Career ==
Hoven started working for the Westinghouse Electric company as a member of the newly formed radio engineering staff. He served as the president of the American Institute of Electrical Engineers from 1955 to 1956.

== Personal life ==
He married Florence Mary Bleecker on 14 October 1927.

He died on 18 October 1976 in Montclair, New Jersey at the age of 79.

== Awards and honours ==
- IEEE Founders Medal in 1970.

== See also ==
- Electrical engineering
