= Louis King (disambiguation) =

Louis King (1898–1962) was an American actor and film director.

Louis King or Lewis King may also refer to:

- Lewis King (born 1980s), English wheelchair rugby league player
- Louis King (basketball) (born 1999), American professional basketball player for the Westchester Knicks
- Louis Vessot King (1874–1965), Canadian academic and physicist
- Louis Magrath King (1886–1949), British consul and author
- Louis King (Shortland Street), fictional character of New Zealand soap opera Shortland Street
- Curt Weiss (born 1959), American musician known by the stage name Lewis King
