= D. Brainerd Holmes =

American business executive (1921–2013)

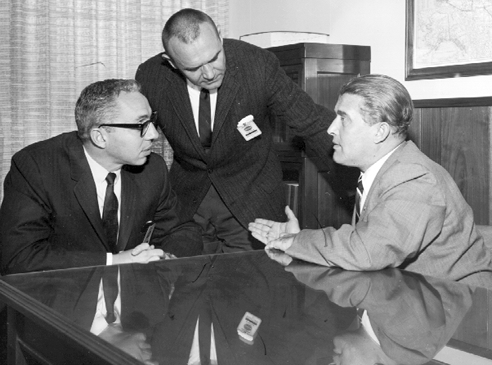
- Holmes (left) with Nicholas Golovin and Wernher von Braun in 1961.
- Born: Dyer Brainerd Holmes; May 24, 1921; Brooklyn, New York
- Died: January 11, 2013 (age 91); Memphis, Tennessee
- Known for: Leading NASA crewed spaceflight program 1961-1963

Dyer Brainerd Holmes (May 24, 1921 – January 11, 2013), known professionally as D. Brainerd Holmes, was an American engineer and business executive. He was perhaps best known for directing NASA's crewed spaceflight program from September 1961 to June 1963, when John Glenn made the pivotal first US orbital spaceflight, but Holmes was also the president of international defense contractor Raytheon. He retired from that post in 1986.

== Career ==
Holmes studied engineering at Cornell University, receiving a degree in electrical engineering. He first worked for Bell Labs and Western Electric, then moved to RCA, becoming heavily involved in military contracting with that firm. He helped to develop the Talos antiaircraft missile, and the electronic heart of the Atlas missile. He was part of the team that developed the US Ballistic Missile Early Warning System, and was therefore highly visible in government circles. In 1961, in response to the Cold War fears that had been fueled by the October 1957 Soviet launch of the Sputnik satellite, US President John F. Kennedy had publicly vowed that his government would put a man on the moon, and safely return him to Earth, before the end of the decade. Holmes was hired to get it done.

During his two-year tenure, he oversaw the Mercury program and planning for Project Gemini and the Apollo program. Possibly due to tensions with NASA Administrator James E. Webb over the extent of his authority to shape and schedule the various facets of the space program, he resigned in 1963 to become an executive at Raytheon. At that company he is credited with helping develop several of that company's missile developments, including the Patriot antiballistic system.

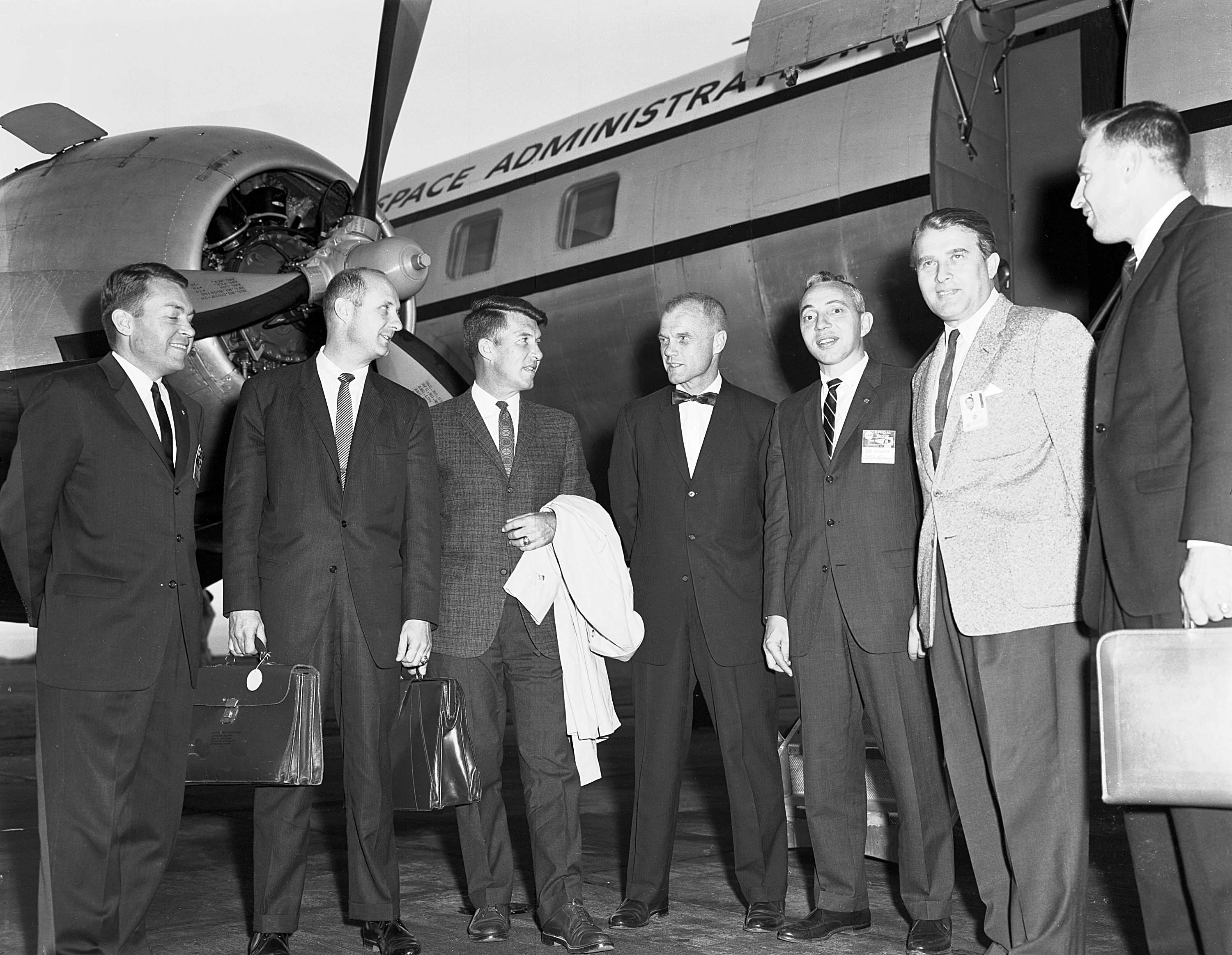
From left to right are Elliot See, Tom Stafford, Wally Schirra, John Glenn, Brainerd Holmes, Wernher von Braun, and Jim Lovell in 1962.

Holmes' leadership in the space program was highlighted by Time magazine in 1962, wherein he was quoted: "When a great nation is faced with a technological challenge, it has to accept or go backward. Space is the future of man, and the US must keep ahead in space."

At Raytheon, Holmes became a top executive, and was its president when it developed the Patriot missile in the 1970s. He also served as chairman of the Beech Aircraft Corporation after it was acquired by Raytheon in 1979.

== Honors and recognition ==
After Holmes was selected to lead the ballistic-missile-tracking program at RCA, Elmer Engstrom, the company president, told an interviewer, "The problem with systems engineering is to find people with a special knack for marrying men, machines, tactics and everything else into one large system. We could see right away that Holmes had the knack."

Holmes was featured on August 10, 1962, cover of Time magazine, featuring the series "Reaching For The Moon".

NASA official Robert R. Gilruth compiled a history of that administration during his tenure. Gilruth had worked hard to persuade Holmes of the merit of a lunar-orbit rendezvous as part of the Moon-landing project, and he wrote of this time that the project's success owed much to Holmes' management-team approach, in which NASA officials "argued out our different opinions" before a course was set. He wrote, "A less skillful leader might have forced an early arbitrary decision that would have made the whole task of getting to the Moon virtually impossible."

Holmes was nominated in 1977 by Raytheon for membership in the National Academy of Engineering. He was a member of the Electronics section of that group.

== Personal life ==
Holmes was a resident of Wellesley, Massachusetts, at the time of his death, but he died in a hospital in Memphis, Tennessee, due to complications of pneumonia. He was survived by his wife, Mary Margaret England Wilkes Holmes. He had two children from a previous marriage and three step-children at the time of death.
