= James R. Wait =

Canadian electrical engineer and physicist (1924–1998)

James R. Wait was a Canadian electrical engineer and engineering physicist. In 1977, he was elected as a member of National Academy of Engineering in Electronics, Communication & Information Systems Engineering for his contributions to electromagnetic propagation engineering as it affects communication and geophysical exploration.

== Biography ==
Wait was born in Ottawa, Ontario, Canada, on January 23, 1924, received his BS (1948) and MS (1949) in engineering physics and his PhD (1951) in electrical engineering, all from the University of Toronto. Between 1948 and 1951, he worked for Newmont Exploration in Jerome, Arizona, where his research led to several patents in both IP and EM methods of geophysical prospecting. After a brief stint with the Defense Research Communications establishment in Ottawa, Wait first joined the National Bureau of Standards in Boulder, Colorado, and then NOAA; at each, he concentrated predominantly on theoretical aspects of radio-wave propagation.

Gertrude L Norman was his spouse, married in 1951 in Jerome AZ, deceased in 2010, Tucson, AZ. He had two Children, Laura H Wait, born 1954 in Ottawa Canada. She is a well known artist, living in Santa Fe. NM. Jim's son George, born in Boulder, CO in 1956, died in 2010 in Tucson, AZ. George had two children James and Carolyn. Jim has two great grandchildren.

He held numerous teaching and visiting scientist research positions at various prestigious universities and research establishments all over the world. In 1980, he was appointed professor of electrical engineering and geosciences at the University of Arizona in Tucson and in 1988 became one of the prestigious Regents' Professors. He died October 1, 1998, at his home in Tucson.

== Publications ==
Some representative of Prof. Wait's crucial journal publications

In IEEE Transactions on Antennas and Propagation

1. 1953 Radiation from a vertical electric dipole over a stratified ground
2. 1954 Radiation from a vertical dipole over a stratified ground (Part II)
3. 1956 On the conductance of slots
4. 1956 Effect of the ground screen on the field radiated from a monopole
5. 1957 The transient behavior of the electromagnetic ground wave on a spherical earth
6. 1958 Pattern of an antenna on a curved lossy surface
7. 1958 On the measurement of ground conductivity at VLF
8. 1959 Guiding of electromagnetic waves by uniformly rough surfaces : Part I
9. 1959 Guiding of electromagnetic waves by uniformly rough surfaces : Part II
10. 1959 U.S.A. national committee report URSI subcommission 6.3 antennas and waveguides, and annotated bibliography
11. 1960 On the excitation of electromagnetic surface waves on a curved surface
12. 1961 Resonance characteristics of a corrugated cylinder excited by a magnetic dipole
13. 1962 Effective impedance of a wire grid parallel to the earth's surface
14. 1963 Preface: Special issue on electromagnetic waves in the earth
15. 1963 The possibility of guided electromagnetic waves in the earth's crust
16. 1963 Curves for ground wave propagation over mixed land and sea paths
17. 1964 Propagation of radio waves past a coast line with a gradual change of surface impedance
18. 1964Influence of a disc-shaped ionospheric depression on VLF propagation
19. 1965 Propagation of electromagnetic pulses in terrestrial waveguides
20. 1966 Radiation from a spherical aperature antenna immersed in a compressible plasma
21. 1966 Influence of a sub-surface insulating layer on electromagnetic ground wave propagation
22. 1967 Asymptotic theory for dipole radiation in the presence of a lossy slab lying on a conducting half-space
23. 1968 Radio propagation over a cylindrical hill including the effect of a surmounted obstacle
24. 1968 Correction to "The whispering gallery nature of the earth-ionosphere waveguide at VLF"
25. 1969 On mode conversion of VLF radio waves at a land-sea boundary
26. 1970 Theory of a vertical tubular antenna located above a conducting half-space
27. 1972 Normal mode model for electromagnetic propagation in the earth crust waveguide
28. 1972 Electromagnetic pulse transmission in homogeneous dispersive rock
29. 1972 Subsurface electromagnetic fields of a circular loop of current located above ground
30. 1972 Electromagnetic scattering from a wire grid parallel to a planar stratified medium
31. 1972 Subsurface electromagnetic fields of a circular loop of current located above ground
32. 1972 Range dependence of the surface impedance and wave tilt for a line-source excited two-layer earth
33. 1973 Effect of edge reflections on the performance of antenna ground screens
34. 1974 Guided electromagnetic waves along an axial conductor in a circular tunnel
35. 1974 Diffusion of electromagnetic pulses into the earth from a line source
36. 1975 On the electromagnetic field of a dielectric coated coaxial cable with an interrupted shield
37. 1975 The transient electric field response of an array of parallel wires on the Earth's surface
38. 1975 Note on excitation of the electromagnetic earth-crust waveguide
39. 1975 Electromagnetic fields of a dielectric coated coaxial cable with an interrupted shield—Quasi-static approach
40. 1977 Effect of a lossy jacket on the external field of a coaxial cable with an interrupted shield
41. 1977 Radio frequency transmission via a trolley wire in a tunnel with a rail return
42. 1994 Comments on "Propagation of EM pulses excited by electric dipole in a conducting medium"
43. 1991 EM scattering from a vertical column of ionization in the Earth-ionosphere waveguide
44. 2000 On the convergence of a perturbation series solution for reflection from periodic rough surfaces

Antennas and Propagation Society International Symposium

1. 1963 Oblique propagation of radio waves across a coast line with a sloping beach
2. 1966 Influence of a sub-surface insulating layer on electromagnetic ground wave propagation
3. 1966 Illumination of an inhomogeneous spherical earth by an LF plane electromagnetic wave
4. 1972 Effect of edge reflections on the performance of antenna ground screens
5. 1973 On the pulse response of a dipole over an impedance surface
6. 1974 Guided electromagnetic waves along axial conductors in a circular tunnel
7. 1975 Electromagnetic fields of a dielectric coated coaxial cable with an interrupted shield
8. 1975 Electromagnetic wave transmission within the earth
9. 1976 Attenuation on a surface wave G-line suspended within a circular tunnel
10. 1979 Ground wave theory via normal modes – an historical perspective
11. 1999 A viable model for power focussing in a lossy cylinder

In IEEE Transactions on Microwave Theory and Techniques

1. 1956 Currents Excited on a Conducting Surface of Large Radius of Curvature
2. 1957 The Impedance of a Wire Grid Parallel to a Dielectric Interface
3. 1967 On the Theory of Shielded Surface Waves
4. 1975 Propagation Along a Braided Coaxial Cable in a Circular Tunnel
5. 1976 Electromagnetic Theory of the Loosely Braided Coaxial Cable: Part I
6. 1976 Propagation Along a Braided Coaxial Cable Located Close to a Tunnel Wall (Short Papers)
7. 1977 Influence of Spatial Dispersion of the Shield Transfer Impedance of a Braided Coaxial Cable (Letters)

In IEEE Transactions on Geoscience and Remote Sensing

1. 1971 Electromagnetic Induction Technique for Locating a Buried Source
2. 1987 Resistivity and Induced Polarization Response for a Borehole Model
3. 1989 Comments, with reply, on "Electric field sensors in electromagnetic sounding" by Wu Xiao Wu and David V. Thiel

In IEEE Transactions on Electromagnetic Compatibility

1. 1974 Comments on "Shielding Performance of Metallic Cylinders" and Comments by C. W. Harrison, Jr., and Reply by D. Schieber
2. 1974 Comments on "The Use of the Lorentz Reciprocity Theorem to Prove Equality of the Open Circuit Voltages of a Receiving Dipole and a Monopole"
3. 1976 Analysis of Radio Frequency Transmission along a Trolley Wire in a Mine Tunnel
4. 1977 Electromagnetic Surface Wave Propagation over a Bonded Wire Mesh
5. 1977 Electromagnetic Field Analysis for a Coaxial Cable with Periodic Slots
6. 1989 Reply to comments on Wait's "In defense of J.A. Stratton"
7. 1994 Comments on "The EM field of an improved lightning return stroke representation"

In the Proceedings of Institution of Electrical Engineers / IEEE

1. 1952 The Magnetic Dipole Antenna Immersed in a Conducting Medium
2. 1953 Complex Magnetic Permeability of Spherical Particles
3. 1956 Radiation Patterns of Circumferential Slots on Moderately Large Conducting Cylinders
4. 1956 An investigation of slot radiators in rectangular metal plates
5. 1957 The Mode Theory of VLF Ionospheric Propagation for Finite Ground Conductivity
6. 1957 The Attenuation vs Frequency Characteristics of VLF Radio Waves
7. 1957 The Geometrical Optics of VLF Sky Wave Propagation
8. 1957 Introduction to the VLF Papers
9. 1959 Preface to the surface wave papers
10. 1960 The Resonance Excitation of a Corrugated-Cylinder Antenna
11. 1962 Introduction to the Theory of VLF Propagation
12. 1962 Average Decay Laws for VLF Fields
13. 1966 Some factors concerning electromagnetic wave propagation in the earth's crust
14. 1966 Groundwave propagation along three-section mixed paths
15. 1974 Recent analytical investigations of electromagnetic ground wave propagation over inhomogeneous earth models

In Electronics Letters

1. 1966 Dipole resonances of a magnetoplasma column
2. 1966 Limiting behaviour of a thin plasma sheet for a transverse magnetic field
3. 1971 Influence of Earth curvature on the subsurface electromagnetic fields of a line source
4. 1971 Electromagnetic-pulse propagation in a simple dispersive medium
5. 1972 Transient magnetic fields produced by a step-function-excited loop buried in the earth
6. 1972 Absorption mode for e.l.f. electromagnetic propagation in the Earth-crust waveguide
7. 1972 Locating an oscillating magnetic dipole in the earth
8. 1973 Resistance of earth electrodes
9. 1976 Long-wave behaviour of the Beverage wave aerial
10. 1976 Analyses of electromagnetic scattering from wire-mesh structures

In India, IEE-IERE Proceedings

1. 1970 Analysis of v.l.f. propagation in the Earth-ionosphere waveguide over a mixed land/sea path. Part I
2. 1970 Analysis of v.l.f. propagation in the Earth-ionosphere waveguide over a mixed land/sea path. Part II
3. 1970 Transient analysis for an electric dipole on a disk ground screen

In IEEE Transactions on Communications

1. 1974 Extremely Low Frequency (ELF) Propagation Along a Horizontal Wire Located Above or Buried in the Earth
2. 1974 Historical Background and Introduction to the Special Issue on Extremely Low Frequency (ELF) Communications
3. 1975 Coupling Between a Radiating Coaxial Cable and a Dipole Antenna
4. 1976 Calculated Channel Characteristics of a Braided Coaxial Cable in a Mine Tunnel

In IEEE Transactions on Communication Technology

1. 1971 Subsurface Electromagnetic Telecommunication—A Review

In IEEE Transactions on Broadcasting

1. 1974 Comments on "Transmission of Circular Polarized Waves Between Elevated Antenna"

In IEEE Journal of Oceanic Engineering

1. 1977 Propagation of ELF electromagnetic waves and project sanguine/seafarer

In IEEE International Conference on Engineering in the Ocean Environment, Ocean 72

1. 1972 The sanguine concept

In International Conference on Mathematical Methods in Electromagnetic Theory, 1998. MMET 98. 1998

1. 1998 VLF scattering from red sprites: vertical columns of ionisation in the Earth-ionosphere waveguide

In IRE Transactions on Communications Systems

1. 1958 Transmission Loss Curves for Propagation at Very Low Radio Frequencies

In IEEE Transactions on Education

1. 1970 A Pitfall in the Scalar Electromagnetic Formulation of Kirchhoff Theory

In Journal of the Acoustical Society of America

1. 1954 Reflection from a mirror surface with an absorbent coating

In Applied Scientific Research B

1. 1954 Reflection at arbitrary incidence from a parallel wire grid, 4, pp. 393–400.

In Canadian Journal of Physics

1. 1955, Scattering of a plane wave from a circular dielectric cylinder at oblique incidence, 33, pp. 189–195.

In Transactions of the American Institute of Electrical Engineers

1. 1949 Detection of Overheated Transmission Line Joints by Means of a Bolometer

=== Wait's books ===
- JR Wait, Electromagnetic Waves in Stratified Media. 1962, Pergamon Press.
- JR Wait, Electromagnetic wave theory. 1985, Harper & Row New York.
- JR Wait, Geo-electromagnetism. 1982, Academic Press New York, NY.
- JR Wait, Wave Propagation Theory. 1981, New York: Pergamon.
- JR Wait, Electromagnetics and plasmas. 1968, Holt, Rinehart and Winston New York.
- JR Wait, Electromagnetic Radiation from Cylindrical Structures. 1959, Pergamon Press.

=== Patents ===
- James R. Wait, Method of geophysical exploration, U.S. patent 2,735,980. June 1956. (Newmont Mining Corporation)

== See also ==
- List of members of the National Academy of Engineering (Electronics)
- IEEE Heinrich Hertz Medal
- Atmospheric electricity
- Earth's magnetic field

== External articles ==
- Recipients of the IEEE Heinrich Hertz Medal, Institute of Electrical and Electronics Engineers
