= James B. Owens =

American engineer and company executive

- Born: July 23, 1920; Houston, Texas, United States
- Died: November 2, 2009 (aged 89); Lincolnshire, Illinois, U.S.
- Education: Rice University
- Known for: Former president of the US Institute of Electrical and Electronics Engineers (IEEE)
- Spouse: Bette Craig
- Children: 2, Craig Owens (critic) and Eric Owens
- Awards: IEEE Founders Medal (1987)

James Beverly Owens (July 23, 1920 – November 2, 2009) was an American engineer and company executive. He was best known for being the president of the US Institute of Electrical and Electronics Engineers (IEEE) in 1983.

== Early life ==
Owens was born in Houston, Texas in July 1920. He attended Rice University and also studied at the Massachusetts Institute of Technology and the Westinghouse Advanced Electrical Design School.

== Career ==
During World War II, he worked for Westinghouse as a designer of military radar technology. He later served as president of Gould-Brown Boveri, an electrical equipment distributor.

He was the president of the IEEE in 1983 as well as on its board of directors from 1981 to 1984. He received the IEEE Founders Medal in 1987 "for exemplary and inspirational leadership, distinguished service, and administrative excellence in electric power engineering and the electrical engineering profession".

== Death ==
Owens died in Lincolnshire, Illinois in November 2009 at the age of 89.
