= Eric Leighton Holmes =

British chemist

Eric Leighton Holmes (4 July 1902 – 20 November 1966) was a British chemist who developed ion exchange resins in 1935, while working for the British Department of Scientific and Industrial Research.

Holmes was born in Hornsea, East Yorkshire. He was educated at Hymers College in Hull from where he obtained scholarships to Imperial College where he graduated BSc (1924) with first-class honours in chemistry and then MSc (1925).

Holmes was a student under Christopher Kelk Ingold at Leeds University for two years from 1925, studying aromatic substitutions. He then moved to the Royal Institution in London and continued his research in this area with Bernhard Flürscheim and Sir William Henry Bragg. In 1931 he moved to the Chemical Research Laboratory at Teddington (now the site of the Laboratory of the Government Chemist and the National Physical Laboratory) where he worked with Professor Gilbert Thomas Morgan on phenolic resins. It was here that Holmes conducted his pioneering research with Basil Albert Adams that led to the development of ion-exchange resins.

The work of Holmes and Adams was read to the Chemical Society in 1934, they applied for patents and published in the journal of the Society of Chemical Industry in 1935. In 1936, Holmes left the Chemical Research Laboratory to work for the next nine years for the Permutit company to develop the ion-exchange resin technologies. After resigning in 1945 he carried out consultancy work for around five years before another spell in industry, this time with the companies Catalin, the Rubber Improvement Company, and Harborough Engineering.

Holmes died in November 1966 after falling ill in May of that year.

Holmes published a paper with Ingold that claimed to experimentally verify Ingold's theories of the electrochemical basis for organic chemical reactions, part of a heated debate between Ingold and Robert Robinson.

He was a 1951 recipient of the Franklin Institute's Howard N. Potts Medal in Chemistry with his co-researcher Basil A. Adams being awarded the Engineering medal for that year. Holmes also received the 1958 John Scott Medal from the City Council of Philadelphia for the same work, with this medal awarded to those whose work has improved the "comfort, welfare, and happiness of human kind". These were both awards made by US institutions, and the author of Holmes's 1967 obituary in the Effluent & Water Treatment Journal expressed regret that he was "not similarly honoured by Britain".
