= Richard M. Osgood Jr. =

American physicist (1943–2023)

Richard Magee Osgood Jr. (December 28, 1943 – October 20, 2023) was an American applied and pure physicist (condensed matter and chemical physics of surfaces, laser technology, nano-optics). He was Higgins Professor of Electrical Engineering and Applied Physics at Columbia University.

== Life and career ==
Richard Magee Osgood Jr. was born on December 28, 1943. He began his scientific career in 1966, after graduating from the U.S. Military Academy with a bachelor's degree in 1965. He obtained a master's degree in 1968 from the Ohio State University. In 1973 he graduated from the Massachusetts Institute of Technology Ph.D. in physics. From 1973 to 1981, he then was on the scientific staff of MIT Lincoln Laboratory. In 1981 he was appointed to the faculty of Columbia University and in 1988 he was made "Higgins Professor" at Columbia University. From 1984 to 1990, he served as Co-Director of the Columbia Radiation Laboratory and in 1986 was founder and until 1990 director of the Microelectronics Sciences Laboratories (MSL) at Columbia University.

In 1980 he served on the "Ad Hoc" U.S. Department of Energy Committee for laser isotope separation. From 1984 to 2001 he was an advisor to the Laser and Laser and Chemistry Divisions of Los Alamos Scientific Laboratory. From 1985 to 2002, he was on the advisory board of the Defense Advanced Research Project Agency (DARPA Defense Sciences Research Council). From 2000 to 2002 he served as associate director of the Brookhaven National Laboratory (Basic Energy Sciences Directorate) and in 2002 Acting Director of the Nanoscience Centre. During this period DOE agreed to build the Center for Functional Nanomaterials at Brookhaven and the Department of Materials Science was initiated. He was in the Basic Energy Sciences Advisory Board of the Department of Energy (DOE) in the mid-1980s.

Osgood was married to Alice (née Dyson) and had three children, Richard M. III, a physicist, Nathaniel D., a computer scientist, and Jennifer Smestad, an attorney. He also had six grandchildren. Richard M. Osgood Jr. died on October 20, 2023, at the age of 79.

== Work ==
His research falls into two broad areas: 1. Condensed matter and chemical physics studies of surfaces; 2. Optical physics and devices. Thus his research has included extensive studies in basic studies in optical-excited and -probed surface physics and chemistry, in the development of new infrared and UV lasers, optical physics, application of lasers for material processing.

His major research highlights are as follows.

He, along with William Eppers, developed the first high power CO laser (a quantum cascade gas laser), as well as other infrared lasers including the first high powered 16 um laser for isotope separation. In 1979 he developed with Daniel Ehrlich and Peter Moulton a UV solid-state laser, then the optically pumped solid-state laser with the shortest wavelength.

Osgood, along with Ali Javan, made the first direct observation of vibrational-vibrational energy transfer and exchange in hydrogen halides. Later he made the first direct observation (with Steven Brueck) of vibration energy flow in molecules in cryogenic liquids the studies. A notable results of this work was the observation of the extremely long (60s) lifetime of N2 in its cryogenic state.

In the late 1970s, he, along with Thomas F. Deutsch and Daniel J. Ehrlich, demonstrated submicrometer-scale chemical processing of the surfaces of electronic materials. These experiments demonstrated deposition of metals, etching of semiconductors, and doping of semiconductors. One these methods, laser-induced Si etching with micrometer resolution with an argon-ion laser, which heated the surface and induced chemical reactions in a chlorine gas or hydrogen chloride gas atmosphere, was later commercialized by Revise, a US semiconductor equipment company founded by Daniel Ehrlich and Kenneth Nill. He and his collaborators also developed techniques for producing spatially defined thin metal films with laser-induced photodissociation.

His work on use of laser micro- (and same cases nano-) chemistry for the processing of electronic materials led to his research examining the fundamental physics and chemistry of laser microchemistry, including the nature of the photodissociation in adsorbed films, the role of surface plasmons in surface photochemistry, and the role of electron-hole pair chemistry and surface interactions in orienting surface species.

From 1998 to 2014 he and Miguel Levy developed ion-based "lift-off" methods for single-crystalline thin films, for example, ion-implantation of He to generate (Crystal Ion Slicing) slicing of metal-oxide films (garnets and ferroelectrics). These garnet thin films were shown to be useful for optical isolators.

In 2001, he, along with Mike Steel, developed novel photonic crystal fibers (photonic crystal fibers, PCF) with an elliptical cavity shape of the tubes and features such as high birefringence with a stable single-mode operation (zero walk off).

In 2002 he pioneered in developing Si photonics wires on silicon on insulator for new compact passive, active, and optical new linear device. His work in nonlinear Si photonics with his students and Jerry Dadap and Nicolae Panoiu is described in this reference. His group carried out the initial studies of linear and nonlinear Si-nanowire-photonics, including in 2001 Raman amplification (optical amplifier) in SOI technology (silicon-on-insulator, that is, silicon wires on an insulating underlay, with dimensions in the sub-micron range) In addition, he developed a high-speed Si thermooptical switch and demonstrated diode-pumped fourwave mixing in the waveguides. In later work, he, along with students and colleagues at IBM Watson Lab, demonstrated the first high gain optical parametric oscillator using an optically pumped Si-wire waveguide. This device operated above the two-photon absorption threshold and thus was not impaired by this nonlinear-loss mechanism.

His research into Si wire waveguides, as well as his earlier work on III-V waveguide devices, led to a major effort to develop a more effective integrated optics design tool that was commonly available at the time. The computational optical simulation work led to the founding of RSoft by Robert Scarmozzino, a major integrated optical simulation company.

In 2005, he, along with Steve Brueck, Nicholae Panoiu, S. Zhang, and W. Fan, demonstrated with the first observation of near infrared. negative refractive index metamaterials.

His research in light interactions with surfaces and this crystal layers led to a series of important experiments showing the role of surface dipoles to orient molecules for anisotropic photo- and electron fragmentation and the importance of coverage in controlling the fragmentation mechanism of surface bound molecules in the presence of UV illuminations, and finally (as mentioned earlier) the role of surface plasmons in enhancing and localizing surface photoreactions. In addition, his research using two-photon photoemission with pulsed UV lasers was instrumental in early studies of image states on vicinal single-crystal metal surfaces. More recently in collaboration with Kevin Knox, Wencan Jin, Po-chun Yeh, Nader Zaki and Jerry Dadap, he used tightly focused UV photoemission based on a SPE-LEEM system to carry out the first photoemission studies of exfoliated graphene and transition metal dichalogide single samples and the influence of surface corrugation and layer number on sample electronic structure.

As of November 11, 2015, Osgood's publications have been cited 13,696 times, and he has an h-index of 65.

== Awards ==
While at MIT, he was awarded a Hertz Foundation Predoctoral Fellowship. In 1989, he was awarded John Simon Guggenheim Fellowship for studies in Light Surface Interactions.

In 1969 he received the Samuel Burka Award of the US Avionics Laboratory and the 1991 R. W. Wood Prize. He was a Fellow of the Optical Society, the IEEE and the American Physical Society (APS).

1991 to 1993 he was Distinguished Traveling Lecturer of the APS and 1986-1987 for IEEE CLEO and he was Plenary Speaker at the OITDA (Japanese Optoelectronic Industry and Technology Development Association).

1981 to 1988 he was Associate Editor of the IEEE Journal of Quantum Electronics and was on the editorial advisory board of the Springer Series in Materials Science.
