= Howard N. Potts Medal =

American science and engineering award

The Howard N. Potts Medal was one of The Franklin Institute Awards for science and engineering award presented by the Franklin Institute of Philadelphia, Pennsylvania. It is named for Howard N. Potts. The first Howard N. Potts Medal was awarded in 1911 but was merged in 1991, along with other Franklin Institute historical awards, into the Benjamin Franklin Medal.

== Laureates ==
The following people received the Howard N. Potts Medal:

- 1911 - William Weber Coblentz (Physics)
- 1912 - William Arthur Bone (Chemistry)
- 1913 - James A. Bizzell (Earth Science)
- 1913 - Thomas Lyttleton Lyon (Earth Science) for "Plants and Relation to Nitrate in Soils"
- 1914 - Ralph Modjeski (Engineering)
- 1916 - William Jackson Humphreys (Physics)
- 1916 - William Spencer Murray (Engineering)
- 1917 - Ulric Dahlgren (Life Science)
- 1918 - Alexander Gray (Engineering)
- 1918 - Arthur Edwin Kennelly (Engineering)
- 1918 - Louis Vessot King (Engineering)
- 1919 - Reynold Janney (Engineering)
- 1919 - Clarence P. Landreth (Chemistry)
- 1919 - Harvey D. Williams (Engineering)
- 1920 - Wendell Addison Barker (Invention)
- 1920 - Edward P. Bullard, Jr. (Engineering)
- 1921 - Elmer Verner McCollum (Life Science)
- 1921 - Alfred O. Tate (Engineering)
- 1922 - Ernest George Coker (Physics)
- 1922 - Charles R. Downs (Chemistry)
- 1922 - Richard Bishop Moore (Chemistry)
- 1922 - J. M. Weiss (Chemistry)
- 1923 - Albert Wallace Hull (Chemistry) for X-ray crystallography
- 1924 - John August Anderson (Engineering)
- 1924 - William Gaertner (Engineering)
- 1925 - Charles Thomson Rees Wilson (Physics)
- 1926 - William David Coolidge (Physics)
- 1926 - Howard W. Matheson (Chemistry)
- 1927 - George E. Beggs (Physics)
- 1927 - Marion Eppley (Engineering)
- 1928 - Eugene C. Sullivan (Chemistry)
- 1928 - William C. Taylor (Chemistry)
- 1928 - Oscar G. Thurow (Engineering)
- 1931 - Benno Strauss (Engineering)
- 1932 - George Paget Thomson (Physics)
- 1933 - Igor Ivanovich Sikorsky (Engineering)
- 1934 - Ernst Georg Fischer (Engineering)
- 1936 - Felix Andries Vening Meinesz (Engineering)
- 1937 - John Clyde Hostetter (Engineering)
- 1938 - Lars Olai Grondahl (Engineering)
- 1939 - Newcomb K. Chaney (Engineering)
- 1939 - H. Jermain Creighton (Engineering)
- 1941 - Harold Eugene Edgerton (Engineering)
- 1942 - Jesse Wakefield Beams (Physics)
- 1942 - Harcourt Colborne Drake (Engineering)
- 1942 - Bernard Lyot (Physics)
- 1943 - Don Francisco Ballen (Life Science)
- 1943 - Paul Renno Heyl (Physics)
- 1945 - Edwin Albert Link (Engineering)
- 1946 - Ira Sprague Bowen (Physics)
- 1946 - Bengt Edlen (Physics)
- 1946 - Sanford Alexander Moss (Engineering)
- 1947 - Vladimir Kosma Zworykin (Engineering)
- 1948 - Eugene Jules Houdry (Chemistry)
- 1948 - Clarence A. Lovell (Engineering)
- 1948 - David Bigelow Parkinson (Engineering)
- 1949 - J. Presper Eckert, Jr. (Computer and Cognitive Science)
- 1949 - Clinton Richards Hanna (Engineering)
- 1949 - John William Mauchly (Computer and Cognitive Science)
- 1950 - Merle Anthony Tuve (Engineering)
- 1951 - Basil A. Adams (Engineering)
- 1951 - Clifford M. Foust (Physics)
- 1951 - Eric Leighton Holmes (Chemistry)
- 1956 - Edwin H. Land (Engineering)
- 1958 - William Nelson Goodwin, Jr. (Engineering)
- 1958 - Emanuel Rosenberg (Engineering)
- 1959 - George W. Morey (Engineering)
- 1960 - Charles Stark Draper (Engineering)
- 1962 - Wilbur H. Goss (Engineering)
- 1964 - Erwin Wilhelm Müller (Engineering)
- 1965 - Christopher Sydney Cockerell (Engineering)
- 1966 - Robert Kunin (Chemistry)
- 1967 - John Louis Moll (Engineering)
- 1968 - Heinrich Focke (Engineering)
- 1969 - Albert Ghiorso (Chemistry)
- 1969 - Charles P. Ginsburg (Engineering)
- 1970 - Jacques-Yves Cousteau (Life Science)
- 1971 - William David McElroy (Life Science)
- 1972 - Jacques Ernest Piccard (Engineering)
- 1973 - Charles Howard Vollum (Engineering)
- 1974 - Jay Wright Forrester (Engineering)
- 1975 - LeGrand G. Van Uitert (Engineering)
- 1976 - Stephanie L. Kwolek (Engineering)
- 1976 - Paul W. Morgan (Engineering)
- 1977 - Godfrey N. Hounsfield (Life Science)
- 1978 - Michael Szwarc (Chemistry)
- 1979 - Seymour Roger Cray (Computer and Cognitive Science)
- 1979 - Richard Travis Whitcomb (Engineering)
- 1980 - Stanley G. Mason (Physics)
- 1981 - August Uno Lamm (Engineering)
- 1982 - Charles Gilbert Overberger (Chemistry)
- 1983 - George G. Guilbault (Life Science)
- 1983 - Paul Christian Lauterbur (Physics)
- 1985 - William Cochran (Life Science)
- 1986 - Martin David Kruskal (Physics)
- 1986 - Norman J. Zabusky (Physics)
- 1988 - Dudley Dean Fuller (Engineering)
- 1989 - Sir Charles William Oatley (Physics)
- 1991 - Richard E. Morley (Computer and Cognitive Science)

== See also ==
- List of general science and technology awards
