= George E. Pake Prize =

American physics award

The George E. Pake Prize is a prize that has been awarded annually by the American Physical Society since 1984. The recipients are chosen for "outstanding work by physicists combining original research accomplishments with leadership in the management of research or development in industry". The prize is named after George E. Pake (1924–2004), founding director of Xerox PARC, and as of 2007 it is valued at $5,000.

== Recipients ==
Source: American Physical Society

- 2026: Jay Gambetta
- 2024: Chih-Yuan Lu
- 2022: Philip J. Wyatt
- 2020: James W. Bray
- 2018: Richard Boudreault
- 2017: Tze-Chiang Chen
- 2016: Robert R. Doering
- 2015: Thomas N. Theis
- 2014: Dale Compton
- 2013: Mark Pinto
- 2012: Thirumalai Venkatesan
- 2011: Bernard S. Meyerson
- 2010: Robert A. Frosch
- 2009: David J. Bishop
- 2008: Julia M. Phillips
- 2007: Mark Kryder
- 2006: Charles B. Duke
- 2005: Cherry Murray
- 2004: Robert M. White
- 2003: C. Paul Robinson
- 2002: Paul M. Horn
- 2001: Lewis S. Edelheit
- 2000: Chauncey Starr
- 1999: Hendrik Brugt Gerhard Casimir
- 1998: John Paul McTague
- 1997: Don R. Scifres
- 1996: Charles V. Shank
- 1995: James C. McGroddy
- 1994: William F. Brinkman
- 1993: Roland W. Schmitt
- 1992: Alan Chynoweth
- 1991: Albert Narath
- 1990: Arno A. Penzias
- 1989: John A. Armstrong
- 1988: C. Kumar N. Patel
- 1987: Praveen Chaudhari
- 1986: John K. Galt
- 1985: J. Ross MacDonald
- 1984: Arthur G. Anderson

== See also ==
- List of physics awards
