= James Hillier =

Canadian-American scientist and inventor (1915–2007)

James Hillier OC
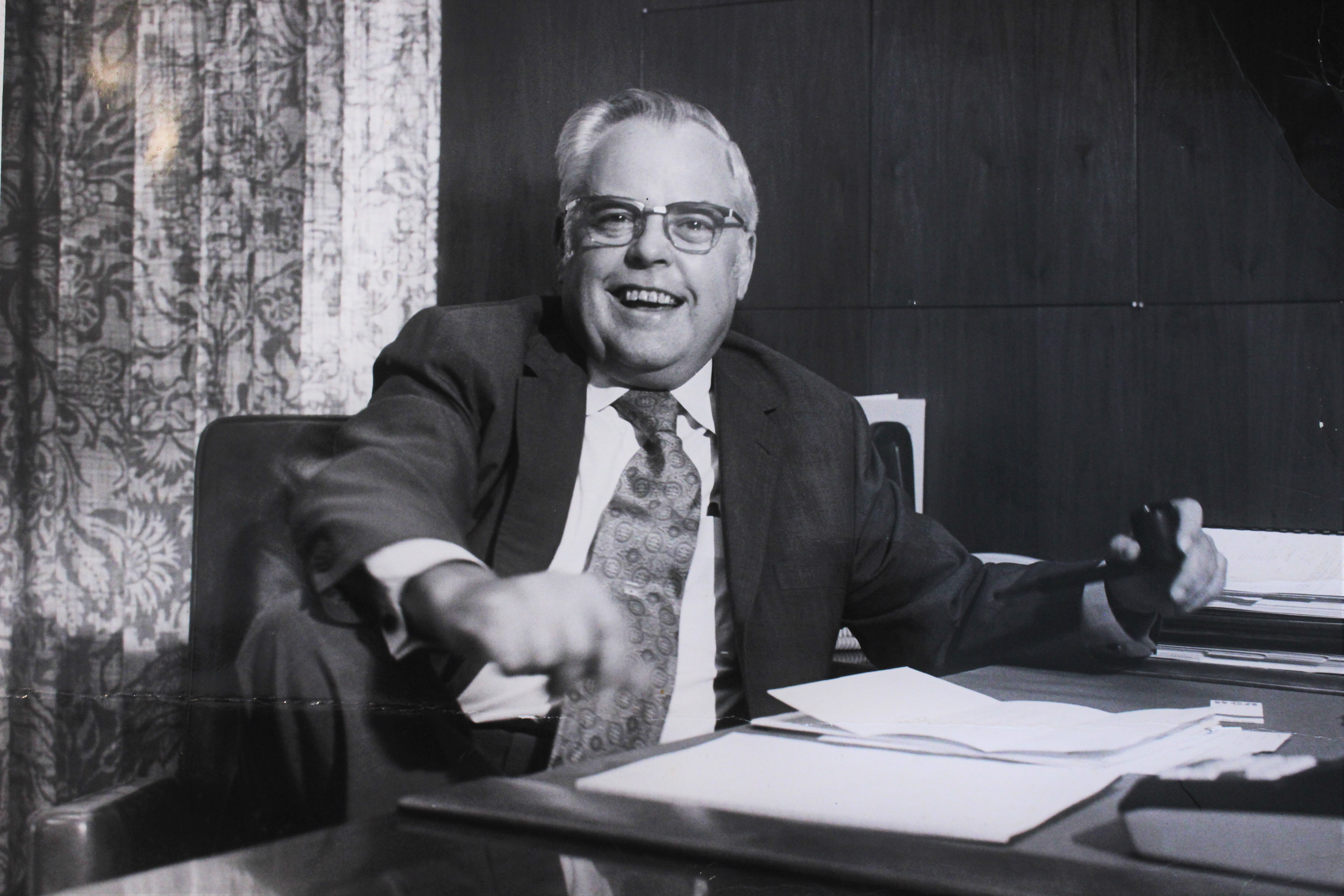
- Born: August 22, 1915; Brantford, Ontario, Canada
- Died: January 15, 2007 (aged 91); Princeton, New Jersey, U.S.
- Citizenship: Canadian
- Education: University of Toronto
- Known for: Commercializing the electron microscope President of the Electron Microscope Society of America (1945)
- Awards: Albert Lasker Award for Basic Medical Research (1960); IEEE Founders Medal (1981)
- Scientific career
- Workplaces: RCA

James Hillier, OC (August 22, 1915 – January 15, 2007) was a Canadian-American scientist and inventor who designed and built, with Albert Prebus, the first successful high-resolution electron microscope in North America in 1938.

== Biography ==
Born in Brantford, Ontario, the son of James and Ethel (Cooke) Hillier, he received a Bachelor of Arts in Mathematics and Physics (1937), Master of Arts (1938), and a Ph.D (1941) from the University of Toronto, where, as a graduate student, he completed a prototype of the electron microscope that had been invented by Ernst Ruska. This transmission electron microscope was used as a prototype for later electron microscopes.

In 1941, he moved to the United States and joined the Radio Corporation of America in Camden, New Jersey. He became General Manager, RCA Laboratories (1957); Vice President, RCA Laboratories (1958); Vice President, Research and Engineering (1968); Executive Vice President, Research and Engineering (1969); and Executive Vice President and Chief Scientist (1976). New technologies developed during his tenure include the system that became RCA SelectaVision. (Note: RCA Laboratories, located in Princeton, NJ, became independent of RCA as a result of the corporate take-over by General Electric in 1986 and became Sarnoff Corporation, a subsidiary of SRI International through 2011, when it was absorbed by SRI.) Hillier spent many years refining the electron microscope and marketing it to research laboratories and universities, receiving a total of 41 patents for devices and processes.

After retiring from RCA in 1977, Hillier advised on the role of technology in the Third World and promoted science education. Although he became a U.S. citizen in 1945, Hillier remained involved with the Brantford community throughout his lifetime. The James Hillier Foundation, established in 1993, awards annual scholarships to Brant County students pursuing education in science.

In 1936, he married Florence Marjory Bell, a union that lasted until Florence's death in 1992. They had two sons: James Robert Hillier and William Wynship Hillier.

A resident of Princeton, New Jersey, Hillier died there on January 15, 2007, due to a stroke.

== Honours ==
- In 1950, the James Hillier Public School in Brantford, Ontario was opened.
- In 1960, he was awarded the Albert Lasker Award for Basic Medical Research.
- In 1975, he was awarded the IRI Medal from the Industrial Research Institute
- In 1980, he was inducted into the National Inventors Hall of Fame.
- In 1981, he received the Founders Medal from the Institute of Electrical and Electronics Engineers.
- In 1997, he was made an Officer of the Order of Canada.
