= George W. Morey =

American chemist

George Washington Morey (9 January 1888, Minneapolis, Minnesota – 3 October 1965, Bethesda, Maryland) was an American geochemist, physical chemist, mineralogist, and petrologist, known for the "Morey bomb" used in hydrothermal research.

== Biography ==
Morey studied chemistry at the University of Minnesota with a bachelor's degree in 1909 and was a member of the Geophysical Laboratory of Carnegie Institution in Washington, D.C., from 1912 until his retirement in 1953. He was acting director of the laboratory from 1952 to 1953 before Philip H. Abelson replaced him.

He focused on experimental investigations of phase equilibria and thermodynamics of silicate melts with volatile components, such as water and carbon dioxide. In both WW I and WW II, Morey, as an expert on glass, was involved in the Laboratory's optical glassmaking projects for military equipment, such as rangefinders and gunsights.

In 1917, Morey co-authored a paper with C. N. Fenner on the development of pressure in magmas resulting from crystallization. In 1925, he again co-authored another ground-breaking paper, this time with N. L. Bowen, on the melting relations of the soda-lime-silica glasses. The system Morey detailed became known as "the foundation of glass science" and led to his classic book, The Properties of Glass in 1938.

Morey received in 1926 the Hillebrand Prize by the Chemical Society of Washington, in 1948 the first Arthur L. Day Medal, and in 1959 the Howard N. Potts Medal (for high refractive index, low dispersion optical glass). He was elected a Fellow of the Geological Society of America, the British Society of Glass Technology, and the American Ceramic Society, which awards a George W. Morey Award for glass technology.

== Selected publications ==
- with Clarence Norman Fenner: The ternary system H_{2}O-K_{2}SiO_{3}-SiO_{2}, Journal of the American Chemical Society, Vol. 40, 1917, pp. 49–59 doi:10.1021/ja02251a008
- A comparison of the heating-curve and quenching methods of melting point determinations, Journal of the Washington Academy of Sciences, Volume 13, 1923, pp. 326–329 JSTOR 24532799
- with Norman L. Bowen: The melting relations of soda-lime-silica glasses, Transactions of the Society of Glass Technology, Vol. 9, 1925, pp. 226–264
- The Composition of Glass, The Scientific Monthly, Vol. 42, 1936, pp. 541–554 JSTOR 15972
- The Properties of Glass, American Chemical Monograph Series, Reinhold, New York, 1938. 2nd edition. 1954.
