= Ralph Bown =

American radio pioneer

- Born: February 22, 1891; Fairport, New York, U.S.
- Died: July 29, 1971 (aged 80); Millburn, New Jersey, U.S.
- Education: Cornell University
- Awards: IEEE Medal of Honor (1949); IEEE Founders Medal (1961)
- Scientific career
- Fields: Electrical engineering
- Workplaces: Bell Laboratories

Ralph Bown (1891 – July 1971) was a noted American radio pioneer.

Bown was born in Fairport, New York, and received his M.E., M.M.E., and Ph.D. degrees from Cornell University where he also taught physics. He served as a captain in the United States Army Signal Corps in World War I, where he led vacuum tube development as head of its radio laboratories technical department, then joined the American Telephone and Telegraph Company research department, which in 1934 became Bell Laboratories.

Bown's work focused on electromagnetic propagation, particularly for radio broadcasting, ship-to-shore communication, aircraft radios, and intercontinental telephony. He was also an expert in radar, and served as a division member and consultant of the National Defense Research Committee and expert consultant to the Secretary of War; in 1941 he visited England to study radar in combat operations. Bown became research director at Bell Labs, and on June 30, 1948, led a press conference announcing the invention of the transistor.

Bown received the IEEE Morris N. Liebmann Memorial Award (1926), and served as President of the Institute of Radio Engineers in 1927. In 1949, he received the IEEE Medal of Honor "for his extensive contributions to the field of radio and for his leadership in Institute affairs."

== Selected works ==
- "Some Recent Measurements of Trans-Atlantic Radio Transmission", American Telephone and Telegraph Company, Proceedings of the National Academy of Sciences, April 24, 1923.
