= LeGrand Van Uitert =

American scientist (1922–1999)

LeGrand Van Uitert (May 8, 1922 in Salt Lake City – June 3, 1999 in Morristown, New Jersey) was an American scientist who co-invented the first continuous beam optical MASER, now known as a laser, using a synthetic rare-earth doped garnet crystal. U.S. patent applications for the invention of the continuous wave optical MASER were filed on August 7, 1961, and issued as U.S. Patent Nos. 3,174,938 (March 23, 1965) and 3,177,154 (April 6, 1965).

In 1964, Van Uitert, Joseph E. Geusic, and H. W. Marcos demonstrated lasing in Nd-Yttrium Aluminum Garnet (Nd:YAG), which would become the dominant solid state laser.

== Academic career ==
Van Uitert pursued undergraduate studies at George Washington University, earning a Bachelor of Science (B. Sc.) degree in chemistry in 1949, and graduate studies at Pennsylvania State University, where he earned a Master's of Science (M. Sc.) degree in chemistry in 1951, followed by a Doctor of Philosophy (Ph.D.) degree in 1952.

Van Uitert was employed as a Member of Technical Staff at Bell Telephone Laboratories (Bell Labs) as a chemist, materials scientist, and crystal grower in the Basic Research division. Van Uitert developed new materials and contributed to the development of new device technologies enabled by these materials in the areas of magnetic, optical, and electro-optical telecommunications, memory storage, and displays.

Van Uitert remained at Bell Labs for his entire career, as an active research scientist as he was promoted to Supervisor, Solid-State Materials Synthesis Group. In 1966, Van Uitert and Geusic were awarded a patent for the Nd: YAG laser.

Van Uitert was the inventor on 82 U.S. patents issued by the USPTO from 1961 to 1991. Van Uitert was supported in his research by Assistant Member of Technical Staff, George John Zydzik, listed as a co-inventor on 17 patents from 1976 to 1991.

In 1975, Van Uitert was awarded the Howard N. Potts Medal by The Franklin Institute for the “discovery and development of ferrites for microwaves.” In 1977, Van Uitert was awarded the IRI Achievement Award by the Industrial Institute of America. In 1981, Van Uitert was elected a Member of the National Academy of Engineering, Also in 1981, Van Uitert was awarded the James N. McGroddy Award for New Materials by the American Physical Society “for the discovery and development of a series of materials of fundamental significance in magnetic and optical technologies, including Microwave Ferrites, Garnets for bubble domain memory devices, and lasers, Orthovanadate phosphors, Niobates and Molybdates for electroptical devices and Borosilicate glasses for optical wave guides." In 1993, Van Uitert and Geusic were awarded the R. W. Wood Prize by the Optical Society of America “for the discovery of the Nd:YAG laser and the demonstration of its usefulness as a practical solid state laser source.”
