= William F. Brinkman =

American physicist

William Frank Brinkman is an American physicist who served as president of the American Physical Society (2002) and was the head of the Office of Science at the United States Department of Energy (2009–2013). He was elected to the National Academy of Sciences in 1984, and won the George E. Pake Prize in 1994. He was elected as a member of the American Academy of Arts and Sciences in 1992, and became a member of the American Philosophical Society in 2002.

Brinkman was born on July 20, 1938, in Washington, Missouri. He received his bachelor's degree (1960) and PhD (1965) in physics from the University of Missouri.

Brinkman joined Bell Labs in 1966, working in the physics research laboratory. From 1984 to 1987, he served as vice president of research at Sandia National Laboratories. In 1987 he became executive director of the physics research division at Bell Labs.

Brinkman joined Princeton University in 2001, where he continued his condensed matter physics research. In 2009, he was appointed as director of the Office of Science in the U.S. Department of Energy, where he served until 2013.
