= Lawrence A. Hyland =

American electrical engineer

- Born: August 26, 1897; Nova Scotia
- Died: November 24, 1989 (aged 92)
- Occupation: Engineer
- Employer: Bendix Corporation (1932–1954); Hughes Aircraft Company (1954–1984); United States Naval Research Laboratory (1926–1932)
- Awards: IEEE Founders Medal (1974)

Lawrence A. "Pat" Hyland (August 26, 1897 – November 24, 1989) was an American electrical engineer. He is one of three individuals who are credited with major contributions to the invention of radar, but is probably best known as the man who transformed Hughes Aircraft from Howard Hughes' aviation "hobby shop" into one of the world's leading technology companies.

Hyland was born in Nova Scotia, Canada, but his family moved to the U.S. in 1899, where he was raised in Massachusetts. He served in the U.S. Army during World War I, and then in the U.S. Navy until 1926. Hyland then joined the U.S. Naval Research Laboratory as a radio engineer. While at NRL he first demonstrated the reflection of radio waves from aircraft, and also made other contributions to the development of doppler radar.

In 1932 Hyland founded the Radio Research Company, which would later be merged into the Bendix Corporation; he eventually became Vice President for Research and Engineering at Bendix.

In 1954 Hyland was hired as vice president and general manager of Hughes Aircraft; he would ultimately become company President and CEO after Howard Hughes' death in 1976. Under Hyland's guidance, Hughes Aircraft continued to diversify and become immensely profitable. Among other accomplishments, the company developed numerous radar systems, electro-optical systems, the first working laser, aircraft computer systems, missile systems, spacecraft, and many other advanced technologies. Hyland retired from active service in 1980, but he retained close contact with the company until his death.

During his lifetime Hyland frequently advised the U.S. government on science and technology. At various times he served as a senior consultant to the President's Science Advisory Committee, the Atomic Energy Commission, and the Central Intelligence Agency; and he was a member of the Defense Industry Advisory Council.

Some of Hyland's honors and awards include:

- 1950 – Navy Distinguished Public Services Award for pioneering contributions to radar
- 1954 – Honorary Doctorate of Engineering, Lawrence Institute of Technology
- 1955 – Named a Fellow of the Institute of Electrical and Electronics Engineers (IEEE)
- 1957 – IEEE Pioneer Award for Aeronautical and Navigation Electronics
- 1967 – Collier Trophy for the Surveyor 1 Moon landing
- 1967 – Armed Forces Communications and Electronics Association Gold Medal for Meritorious Service
- 1974 – IEEE Founders Medal for leadership and management in the field of electronics

Hyland's autobiography, Call Me Pat: The Autobiography of the Man Howard Hughes Chose to Lead Hughes Aircraft, was published posthumously in 1994.
