= C. Paul Robinson =

American physicist (1941–2023)

C. Paul Robinson (October 9, 1941 – March 2, 2023) was an American physicist.

== Biography ==
Robinson was born in Detroit, Michigan on October 9, 1941. He received his Ph.D. in physics from Florida State University and spent most of his career at Los Alamos National Laboratory and Sandia National Laboratories, becoming President of Sandia Corporation in 1995. He served as head of delegation and chief negotiator for the United States in the Nuclear Testing Talks with the Union of Soviet Socialist Republics. These negotiations produced Protocols to the Threshold Test Ban Treaty and the Peaceful Nuclear Explosions Treaty. Both, along with the treaties, were ratified unanimously by the U.S. Senate and remain in force. The negotiations included agreement for, and execution of, the Joint Verification Experiment, carried out in 1988 as the Kearsarge event in Operation Touchstone. He died on March 2, 2023, at the age of 81.

== Awards and honors ==
- Member, National Academy of Engineering, Special fields and interdisciplinary (1998)
- George E. Pake Prize (2003)
