= R. W. Wood Prize =

The R. W. Wood Prize is an award endowed by Xerox and given by Optica to an individual that makes an outstanding technical contribution or an invention in the field of optics. The award was established in 1975 in commemoration of Robert W. Wood.

Past winners of the award include Margaret Murnane, Marvin Minsky, Carl Wieman, Gérard Mourou, and Theodore H. Maiman.

== Recipients ==
- 2026 - Jelena Vučković
- 2025 - Fiorenzo Omenetto
- 2024 - Rick Trebino
- 2023 - Alexandra Boltasseva
- 2022 - Shanhui Fan
- 2021 - Tobias Kippenberg
- 2020 - John Michael Dudley
- 2019 - Jian-Wei Pan
- 2018 - Chris Barty
- 2017 - Michal Lipson
- 2016 - Kishan Dholakia
- 2015 - Peter J. Nordlander
- 2015 - Naomi Halas
- 2014 - Michael Bass
- 2013 - Milton Feng
- 2012 - Eric Van Stryland
- 2012 - Mansoor Sheik-Bahae
- 2011 - Demetrios N. Christodoulides
- 2010 - Henry Kapteyn
- 2010 - Margaret Murnane
- 2009 - Paul G. Kwiat
- 2008 - Andrew M. Weiner
- 2008 - Jonathan P. Heritage
- 2007 - Bahram Jalali
- 2006 - Alexander Efros
- 2006 - Aleksey Ekimov
- 2006 - Louis E. Brus
- 2005 - Masataka Nakazawa
- 2004 - Rangaswamy Srinivasan
- 2004 - James J. Wynne
- 2004 - Samuel E. Blum
- 2003 - George I. Stegeman
- 2002 - Pierre Meystre
- 2001 - Federico Capasso
- 2000 - Marvin Minsky
- 2000 - M. David Egger
- 2000 - Paul Davidovits
- 1999 - Eric A. Cornell
- 1999 - Carl Wieman
- 1998 - Robert L. Byer
- 1998 - Martin Fejer
- 1997 - Peter Moulton
- 1996 - Eli Yablonovitch
- 1995 - Gérard Mourou
- 1994 - Dana Z. Anderson
- 1993 - Joseph E. Geusic
- 1993 - LeGrand Van Uitert
- 1992 - Yuri N. Denisyuk
- 1991 - Thomas F. Deutsch
- 1991 - Richard M. Osgood
- 1991 - Daniel J. Ehrlich
- 1990 - Rogers H. Stolen
- 1989 - Daniel R. Grischkowsky
- 1988 - Daniel S. Chemla
- 1988 - David A. B. Miller
- 1987 - David E. Aspnes
- 1986 - Joseph A. Giordmaine
- 1986 - Robert C. Miller
- 1985 - David H. Auston
- 1984 - Otto Wichterle
- 1983 - Sven R. Hartmann
- 1982 - Linn F. Mollenauer
- 1981 - Charles V. Shank
- 1981 - Erich P. Ippen
- 1980 - Anthony E. Siegman
- 1979 - Peter Franken
- 1978 - Peter P. Sorokin
- 1977 - Peter Fellgett
- 1976 - Theodore H. Maiman
- 1975 - Emmett N. Leith
- 1975 - Juris Upatnieks

== See also ==
- List of physics awards
