= Bahram Jalali =

- Citizenship: United States
- Education: Columbia University (PhD)
- Scientific career
- Fields: Electrical engineering
- Institutions: Bell Laboratories; University of California, Los Angeles

Bahram Jalali is a Distinguished Professor Emertitus at the Electrical and Computer Engineering at University of California, Los Angeles whose research has spanned silicon photonics, ultrafast instruments and imaging

He is a Fellow of the American Physical Society, SPIE, Institute of Electrical and Electronics Engineers and The Optical Society. In 2007, he was given the R. W. Wood Prize by the Optical Society.

Jalali received his Ph.D. in Applied Physics at Columbia University in 1989 and worked with Bell Laboratories from 1988 to1992 before joining UCLA's faculty.

He was elected to the National Academy of Engineering in 2022.
