= Irwin Dorros =

American telecommunications executive and engineer (1929–2019)

- Born: October 3, 1929; Brooklyn, New York
- Died: June 22, 2019 (aged 89); New Jersey
- Education: Massachusetts Institute of Technology; Columbia University
- Spouse: Janet
- Children: three
- Awards: IEEE Founders Medal (1991)

Irwin Dorros (October 3, 1929 – June 22, 2019) was an American telecommunications executive and engineer.

Dorros was born in New York and attended the Massachusetts Institute of Technology and Columbia University. From 1956 to 1978, he served as the executive director of Bell Telephone Laboratories. He later left Bell to join AT&T for which he served as an assistant vice president from 1978 to 1983. In 1979, Irwin Dorros was elevated to the grade of IEEE fellow for the management of engineering projects associated with integrated nationwide telecommunications. From 1984 to 1993, he was Executive vice president technical services for Bellcore. He received the IEEE Founders Medal in 1991 "for distinguished technical leadership in the evolution of national telecommunications networks and the implementation of a major R&D resource".
