= David A. B. Miller =

British physicist

David Andrew Barclay Miller
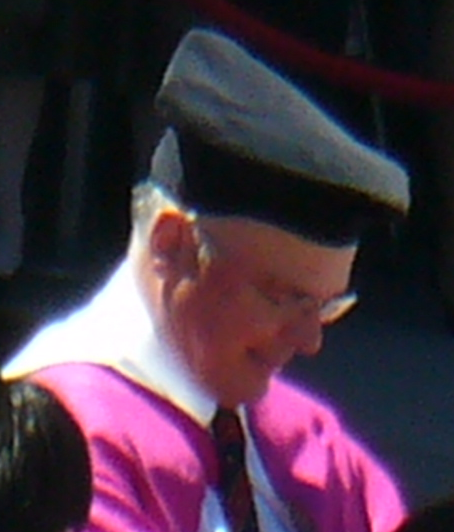
- David A. B. Miller, W.M. Keck Foundation Professor of Electrical Engineering and by courtesy of Applied Physics
- Born: February 19, 1954; Hamilton, South Lanarkshire, Scotland
- Education: University of St Andrews
- Known for: quantum mechanics physics interconnects optics optoelectronics
- Awards: R. W. Wood Prize (1988)
- Scientific career
- Fields: Electrical Engineering, Physics
- Workplaces: Stanford University
- Thesis: Nonlinear Optical Effects in InSb with a cw CO Laser (May 1979)
- Doctoral advisor: S.D. Smith

David A. B. Miller is the W. M. Keck Foundation Professor of Electrical Engineering at Stanford University, emeritus since October 2024. His research interests include the use of optics in switching, interconnection, communications, computing, and sensing systems, physics and applications of quantum well optics and optoelectronics, and fundamental features and limits for optics and nanophotonics in communications and information processing.

== Academic education ==
Miller completed a BS degree in physics from St. Andrews University and received his PhD in physics in 1979 from Heriot-Watt University. In 1997 he was awarded an honorary doctorate from Vrije Universiteit Brussel, and in 2003 he was awarded an honorary doctorate of engineering from Heriot-Watt University, Edinburgh.

== Career ==
Following postdoctoral and lecturer positions at Heriot-Watt, Miller began working at AT&T Bell Laboratories in 1981 as a Member of Technical Staff, and from 1987 to 1996 was Department Head of the Advanced Photonics Research Department. In 1996 he joined Stanford's Department of Electrical Engineering as a professor. From 1997 to 2006 he was Director of the Ginzton Lab; and from 1997 to 2009, Director of the Solid State Photonics Lab. He is currently the W. M. Keck Professor of Electrical Engineering, and a co-director of the Stanford Photonics Research Center.

Since 2013, he has taught open online classes on Quantum Mechanics for Scientists and Engineers, attracting more than 30,000 student registrations.

Miller is a fellow of the Optical Society of America, the American Physical Society, and IEEE. He was elected to the National Academy of Sciences in 2008.

Miller is a Fellow of OSA, IEEE, American Physical Society (APS), the Royal Society of Edinburgh and the Royal Society. He is a Member of the National Academy of Sciences and the National Academy of Engineering.

He was President of the IEEE Lasers and Electro-Optics Society (now IEEE Photonics Society) in 1995.

== Research ==
Miller studies optical and optoelectronic devices including quantum wells and photonic nanostructures, especially for information sensing, communication, switching and processing. He also investigates more generally the fundamentals of optics in these applications, with current research including dense optical interconnection to silicon electronics, quantum well optical physics and devices, nanometallic photonics, and fundamental limits in optics.

He has published more than 270 scientific papers and wrote the textbook, "Quantum Mechanics for Scientists and Engineers". Miller holds 74 U.S. patents.

== Awards and honors ==
- Frederic Ives Medal / Jarus W. Quinn Prize, 2025
- Carnegie Millennium Professorship, 2013
- Prize of the International Commission for Optics, 1991
- R. W. Wood Prize of the Optical Society of America, 1988 – with D. S. Chemla
- Adolph Lomb Medal of the Optical Society of America, 1986
- H-index (December, 2024) – 115 (Google Scholar)

== Books ==
- Quantum Mechanics for Scientists and Engineers (Cambridge, 2008).
