= Peyman Milanfar =

American computer scientist

Peyman Milanfar is a Distinguished Scientist at Google, where he leads the Computational Imaging team. Formerly Professor of Electrical Engineering at the University of California Santa Cruz, from 1999 to 2014, he also served as Associate Dean for Research at the School of Engineering from 2010 to 2012. From 2012 to 2014, he was on leave at Google X, where he helped develop the imaging pipeline for Google Glass. Most recently, his team at Google developed the digital zoom pipeline for the Pixel phones, which includes the multi-frame super-resolution "Super Res Zoom" technology, and the RAISR upscaling algorithm. In addition, the Night Sight mode on Pixel 3 uses the Super Res technology (whether zoomed or not) for vivid shots in all lighting conditions.

His work focuses on the development of super-resolution, statistical analysis of performance limits for inverse problems in imaging, and the development of adaptive non-parametric techniques (kernel regression) for image and video processing. He holds more than forty US patents in the field of imaging, video, and computer vision.

Milanfar did his undergraduate studies at University of California, Berkeley, graduating in 1988, with a joint degree in Mathematics and Electrical Engineering. Milanfar received his Ph.D. in Electrical Engineering and Computer Sciences from MIT in 1993, with Alan S. Willsky. He was a research scientist at SRI International from 1994 to 1999 before moving to UC Santa Cruz.

== Awards and honors ==
In 2026, Milanfar was elected to the National Academy of Engineering for his contributions to computational photography. He was elected to IEEE Fellow in 2010 for contributions to inverse problems and super-resolution in imaging. In 2000, Milanfar won a CAREER award from the US National Science Foundation. He is a Distinguished Lecturer of the IEEE Signal Processing Society.

== Publications ==
He has published more than 288 peer-reviewed journal and conference articles. He won a best paper awards from IEEE in 2010 and 2021.

== Books ==
Peyman Milanfar, Ed., Super-resolution Imaging, CRC Press, 2010
