= Charles V. Shank =

American physicist (born 1943)

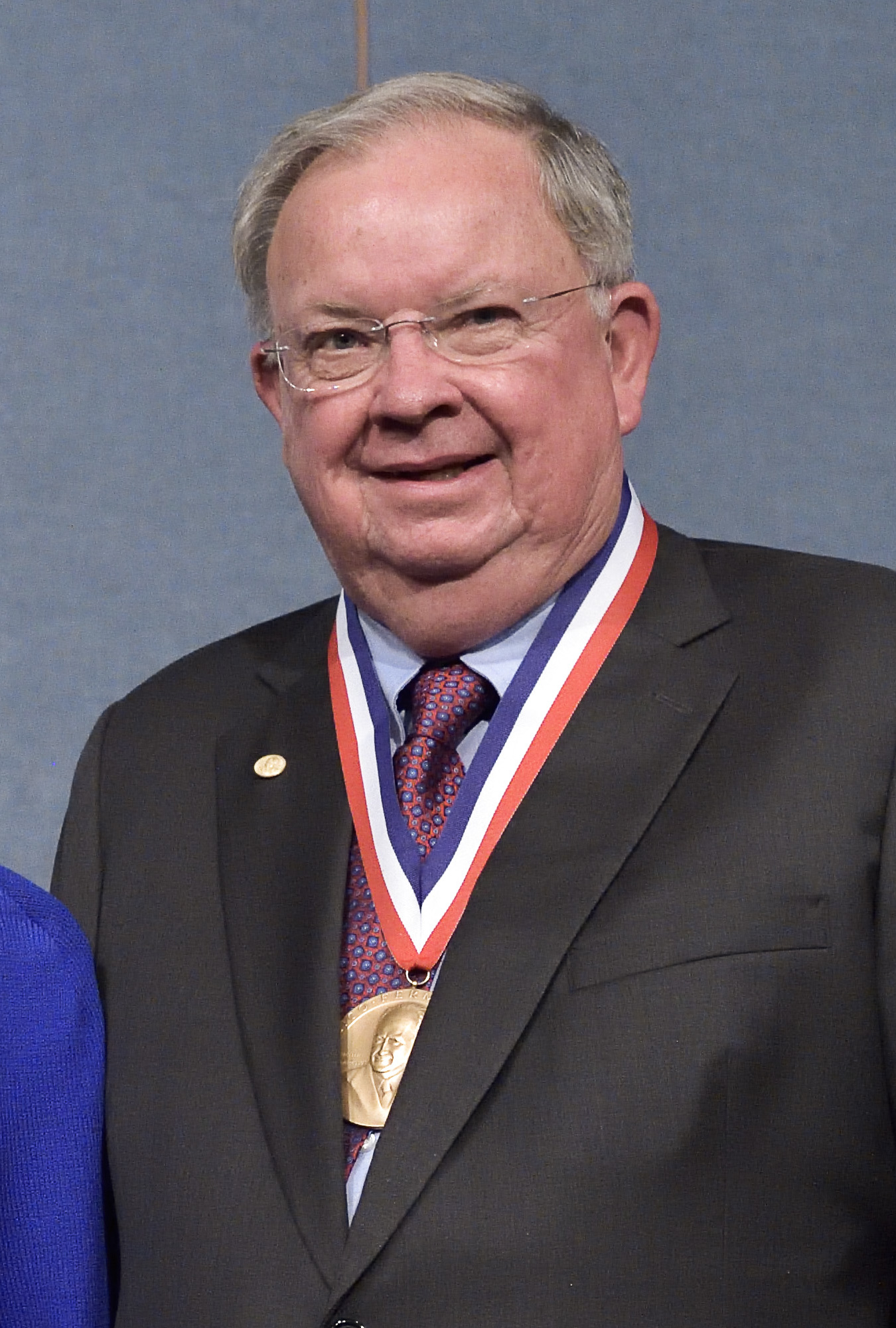
- Born: July 12, 1943 (age 83); Mount Holly, New Jersey, U.S.
- Education: University of California, Berkeley
- Known for: Director of Lawrence Berkeley National Laboratory
- Awards: R. W. Wood Prize (1981); Edward Longstreth Medal (1982); Morris E. Leeds Award (1983); David Sarnoff Award (1989); Distinguished Engineering Alumnus Award (1990); Edgerton Award (1990); George E. Pake Prize (1996); Arthur L. Schawlow Prize in Laser Science (1997); Charles Hard Townes Award (2002); Enrico Fermi Award (2014)
- Scientific career
- Fields: Physics
- Workplaces: Bell Laboratories; Lawrence Berkeley National Laboratory; University of California, Berkeley
- Thesis: Nonlinear Wave Interaction Spectroscopy (1969)
- Doctoral advisor: Steven E. Schwarz

Charles Vernon "Chuck" Shank (born July 12, 1943) is an American physicist, best known as the director of the Lawrence Berkeley National Laboratory from 1989 to 2004.

== Early life and education ==
Charles Vernon (Chuck) Shank was born in Mount Holly, New Jersey, on July 12, 1943. He entered the University of California, Berkeley, where he earned his Bachelor of Science (B.S.) degree in 1965, his Master of Science (M.S.) in 1966, and his Doctor of Philosophy (Ph.D.) in 1969, all in electrical engineering, writing his doctoral thesis on "Nonlinear Wave Interaction Spectroscopy", under the supervision of Steven E. Schwartz.

== Career ==
After graduation, Shank joined the staff of the Bell Laboratories as a researcher. He would remain there for 20 years, becoming head of its Quantum Physics and Electronic Research Department in 1976, and director of its Electronics Research Laboratory in 1983. Shank introduced the use of short laser pulses to study ultrafast events, ones that take place in a femtosecond, and is considered to be the founder of ultrafast science. He pioneered the field of femtochemistry, developing its techniques and technologies, and laser communications, and is the co-inventor of the distributed feedback laser. He studied the femtochemistry of rhodopsin, a photosensitive pigment found in the eye that is an important component of the mechanism of human vision. But since many chemical reactions take place in femtoseconds, ultrafast science found uses in chemistry, biology, physics, materials science, medicine, meteorology and manufacturing.

Shank became the director of the Lawrence Berkeley National Laboratory in 1989. Under his directorship, the laboratory pursued a diverse range of initiatives, usually in cooperation with other agencies. Through the National Energy Research Scientific Computing Center, he made the laboratory a locus for supercomputing. Working with the Lawrence Livermore National Laboratory and the Los Alamos National Laboratory, he helped create the Joint Genome Institute to work on the Human Genome Project. Through this joint effort the complete sequences of Chromosomes 5, 16 and 19 were mapped. The laboratory's SuperNova Acceleration Probe (SNAP) formed part of the Joint Dark Energy Mission to explore dark energy in collaboration with NASA, and it worked with the University of California, San Francisco's Comprehensive Cancer Center to study the disease. He strongly supported nanoscience, and was co-author of Complex Systems: Science for the 21st Century (1999), in which it was an important theme.

In 1989 Shank was a member of the California Council on Science and Technology. The following year he was a member of the National Critical Technologies Panel in the Office of Science and Technology. In this role he helped identify the most critical technologies required to advance the United States' national security and economic prosperity. He chaired the National Research Council's Committee on Optical Science and Engineering, and was the co-author of Harnessing Light: Optical Science and Engineering for the 21st Century (1998). He was a member of the National Academy of Sciences' Air Force Studies Board, and of the Central Intelligence Agency's Intelligence Science Board.

Shank retired from the Lawrence Berkeley Laboratory in 2004, and became a professor of chemistry, physics, electrical engineering, and computer science at the University of California, Berkeley. As of 2015, he is a member of the advisory board of the Lawrence Berkeley Laboratory. He remains a professor emeritus at the University of California, Berkeley, and is a member of campus advisory boards. He is also a senior fellow at the Howard Hughes Medical Institute's Janelia Research Campus.

== Accolades ==
Over the years, Shank received a number of accolades and awards. He was elected a member of the National Academy of Sciences in 1984, the National Academy of Engineering in 1983, and the American Academy of Arts and Sciences, and is a fellow of the American Association for the Advancement of Science, the American Physical Society, the Institute of Electrical and Electronics Engineers (IEEE), and the Optical Society of America. He was awarded the Optical Society of America's R. W. Wood Prize in 1981, the Franklin Institute's Edward Longstreth Medal in 1982, the IEEE's Morris E. ds Award in 1983 and David Sarnoff Award in 1989), the University of California's Distinguished Engineering Alumnus Award in 1990, the International Society for Optical Engineering's Edgerton Award in 1990, the American Physical Society's George E. Pake Prize in 1996, and Arthur L. Schawlow Prize in Laser Science in 1997, the Optical Society of America's Charles Hard Townes Award in 2002, and the United States Department of Energy's Enrico Fermi Award in 2014.

== Patents ==
- Distributed feedback devices with perturbations deviating from uniformity for removing mode degeneracy
- Mode-locked laser
