= Journal of Materials Research and Technology =

- Discipline: Materials science
- Language: English
- Edited by: Marc André Meyers

Publication details
- History: 2012-present
- Publisher: Elsevier on behalf of the Brazilian Metallurgical, Materials and Mining Association
- Frequency: Quarterly
- Open access: Yes
- Impact factor: 6.4 (2022)

Standard abbreviations
- ISO 4: J. Mater. Res. Technol.

Indexing
- CODEN: JMRTAL
- ISSN: 2238-7854 (print); 2214-0697 (web)
- OCLC no.: 858794349

Links
- Journal homepage

The Journal of Materials Research and Technology is a quarterly peer-reviewed open access scientific journal covering metallurgy and materials and minerals research and technology. It is published by Elsevier on behalf of the Brazilian Metallurgical, Materials and Mining Association. The editor-in-chief is Marc A. Meyers (University of California, San Diego).

== Abstracting and indexing ==
The journal is abstracted and indexed in Scopus.
