= Louis Vessot King =

Canadian academic and physicist

- Born: 18 April 1886; Toronto
- Died: 6 June 1956 (aged 70)
- Education: McGill University; University of Cambridge
- Awards: Howard N. Potts Medal (1918)
- Scientific career
- Fields: Physics
- Workplaces: McGill University

Louis Vessot King FRSC FRS (1886–1956) was a Canadian academic and physicist.

== Biography ==
L. V. King received from McGill University B.A. in 1905 and D.Sc. in 1915 and from the University of Cambridge B.A. in 1908 and M.A. in 1913. In the department of physics of McGill University he became a lecturer in 1910, an assistant professor in 1913, an associate professor in 1915, and a full professor (MacDonald Professor of Physics) in 1920, retiring in 1938 as professor emeritus. He was elected a Fellow of the Royal Society of Canada in 1915. He was elected a Fellow of the Royal Society on 5 May 1924. He was an Invited Speaker of the ICM in 1924 in Toronto.

King's major research and publishing interests lay in fog alarm research, applications of electromagnetism, heat convection, and radiation. He developed the gyromagnetic electron theory, invented the hot-wire anemometer and worked on methods of submarine detection in World War I.

King corresponded with Ernest Rutherford, Napier Shaw, Étienne Biéler, and H. T. Barnes.
