= Malcolm R. Currie =

American engineer and former executive (1927–2021)

- Born: Malcolm Roderick Currie; March 13, 1927; Spokane, Washington
- Died: April 18, 2021 (aged 94)
- Education: University of California, Berkeley
- Spouse(s): Sunya Lofsky (1951–?); Barbara L. Dyer (m.1977)
- Children: 3
- Awards: IEEE Founders Medal (1995)

Malcolm Roderick Currie (March 13, 1927 – April 18, 2021) was an American engineer and former executive.

Currie was born in Spokane, Washington, the son of Erwin Caster Currie and Genevieve Hauenstein and attended the University of California, Berkeley where he earned his bachelor's and master's degrees along with his PhD. He was the CEO of Hughes Aircraft Company from 1988 to 1992, having worked for Hughes starting in 1954, serving in various leadership positions previously, including President of the Missile Systems Group, vice president, and associate director of the Hughes Research Laboratories. From 1985 to 1988 he was also CEO of Delco Electronics and VP of Research and Development for Beckman Instruments from 1969 to 1973.

From 1973 to 1977, he served as the United States Under Secretary of Defense for Research and Engineering. In 1988, he was nominated by President Ronald Reagan to serve as a Member of the President's National Security Telecommunications Advisory Committee. He married Sunya Lofsky in 1951 and with her had three children. In 1977, he married Barbara Dyer. He received the IEEE Founders Medal in 1995 "for technical and managerial leadership in the electronics industry".

Dr. Currie was also instrumental in legislatively creating the Federal Low Speed Electric Bicycles Laws (LSEBs), and moving control away from the NHTSA. Dr. Currie's efforts, in partnership with Malcolm Bricklin, resulted in the first ever Federal ebike laws.

17 days before Dr. Currie died, he had a short video taken of him saying that “There are aliens”. The video was posted on YouTube on 1 April, and the uploader later admitted in the comments that it was an April Fools’ joke.

Dr. Currie died on April 18, 2021. He was remembered by USC as "a defense and aerospace industry leader."
