= IEEE Founders Medal =

- Awarded for: Outstanding contributions in the leadership, planning, and administration of affairs of great value to the electrical and electronics engineering profession
- Presented by: Institute of Electrical and Electronics Engineers
- First award: 1952
- Website: IEEE Founders Medal

The IEEE Founders Medal is an award presented for outstanding contributions in the leadership, planning, and administration of affairs of great value to the electrical and electronics engineering profession. It may be presented to an individual or team of up to three in number. This medal was established by the Institute of Radio Engineers (IRE) in 1952. The medal continued to be awarded after the merge of the IRE with the American Institute of Electrical Engineers (AIEE) in 1963 to form the IEEE. Recipients of this medal receive a gold medal, bronze replica, certificate, and cash honorarium.

The award is sponsored by the IEEE Foundation.

The basis for Judging: In the evaluation process, the following criteria are considered: outstanding leadership, planning or administration of affairs related to the profession, major industry administrator and manager of a complex scientific mission. An additional consideration may be service to the IEEE beyond normal expectations.

Nomination deadline: 1 July

Notification: Recipients are typically approved during the November IEEE Board of Directors meeting. Recipients and their nominators will be notified following the meeting. Then the nominators of unsuccessful candidates will be notified of the status of their nomination.

Presentation: At the annual IEEE Honors Ceremony

== Recipients ==
The following people have received the IEEE Founders Medal:

- 2026: Marian R. Croak
- 2025: Mung Chiang
- 2024: Tsu-Jae King Liu
- 2023: Rodney Brooks
- 2022: John Brooks Slaughter
- 2021: Henry Samueli
- 2020: Jensen Huang
- 2019: Robin Saxby
- 2018: Narayana Murthy
- 2017: Takeo Kanade
- 2016: No award
- 2015: James D. Plummer
- 2014: Eric Schmidt
- 2013: Leo Beranek
- 2012: Faqir Chand Kohli
- 2011: James F. Gibbons
- 2010: Paul E. Gray
- 2009: Craig R. Barrett
- 2008: Steven Sample
- 2007: Anita K. Jones
- 2006: Toshiharu Aoki
- 2005: Eugene Wong
- 2004: Mildred Dresselhaus
- 2003: Ray Stata
- 2002: Thomas E. Everhart
- 2001: Robert A. Frosch
- 2000: Robert W. Galvin
- 1999: Benjamin M. Rosen
- 1998: Alan W. Rudge
- 1997: Gordon E. Moore
- 1996: Norman R. Augustine
- 1995: Malcolm R. Currie
- 1994: Akio Morita
- 1993: Kenneth H. Olsen
- 1992: Roland W. Schmitt
- 1991: Irwin Dorros
- 1990: Erich Bloch
- 1989: Ivan A. Getting
- 1988: Ian Munro Ross
- 1987: James B. Owens
- 1986: George H. Heilmeier
- 1985: William C. Norris
- 1984: Koji Kobayashi
- 1983: Joseph M. Pettit
- 1982: Shigeru Yonezawa
- 1981: James Hillier
- 1980: Simon Ramo
- 1979: Hanzo Omi
- 1978: Donald G. Fink
- 1977: Jerome B. Weisner
- 1976: Edward W. Herold
- 1975: John Grist Brainerd
- 1974: Lawrence A. Hyland
- 1973: William R. Hewlett and David Packard
- 1972: Masaru Ibuka
- 1971: Ernst Weber
- 1970: Morris D. Hooven
- 1969: E. Finley Carter
- 1968: Patrick E. Haggerty
- 1967: Harvey Fletcher
- 1966: Elmer W. Engstrom
- 1965: No Award
- 1964: Andrew G. L. McNaughton
- 1963: Frederick E. Terman
- 1962: No Award
- 1961: Ralph Bown
- 1960: Haraden Pratt
- 1959: No Award
- 1958: W.R.G. Baker
- 1957: Raymond A. Heising
- 1956: No Award
- 1955: No Award
- 1954: Alfred N. Goldsmith
- 1953: David Sarnoff
