= Bernard S. Meyerson =

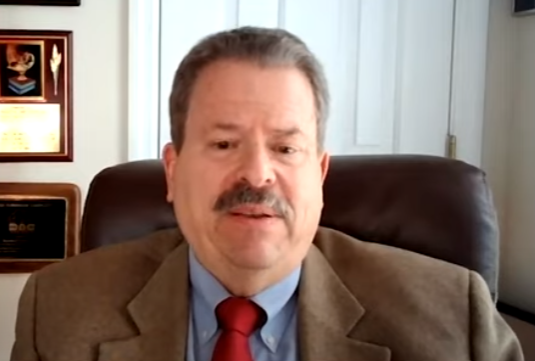
- In the World Economic Forum video Launch of the Top 10 Emerging Tech of 2021
- Born: June 2, 1954 (age 71); New York, New York
- Education: City College of New York; City University of New York
- Occupation: Solid state physicist
- Awards: J. J. Ebers Award (2000)

Bernard Steele Meyerson (born June 2, 1954) is an American solid state physicist.

== Biography ==
Meyerson is a native of New York City, born on June 2, 1954. After graduating from the City College of New York, he completed a master's degree and doctorate at the City University of New York, and began working for IBM.

Meyerson was elected a fellow of the American Physical Society in 1998, "for the invention of ultra-high vacuum chemical vapor deposition and its application to low temperature silicon epitaxy, especially the fabrication of SiGe heterojunction bipolar integrated circuits for wireless telecommunications." The APS awarded him the George E. Pake Prize in 2011. Meyerson received the J. J. Ebers Award in 2000 from the IEEE Electron Devices Society. In 2002, Meyerson became an elected member of the National Academy of Engineering.
