= Jian Song =

Chinese electronics engineer

Jian Song from Tsinghua University, Beijing, China was named Fellow of the Institute of Electrical and Electronics Engineers (IEEE) in 2016 for contributions to digital television broadcasting.

Song was elected a member of the National Academy of Engineering for contributions to aerospace engineering, environmental protection, science and technology administration, and fostering international technical cooperation.
