= Albert Narath (chemist) =

German chemist (1933–2023)

- Born: March 5, 1933; Berlin, Germany
- Died: May 2, 2023 (aged 90); Albuquerque, New Mexico, United States
- Citizenship: American
- Occupation: Scientist

Albert Narath (March 5, 1933 – May 2, 2023) was a German-born American chemist who served as president of Sandia National Laboratories from 1989 to 1995.

== Biography ==
Narath was born on March 3, 1933, in Berlin, Germany.

== Education ==
Narath received a bachelor's degree in chemistry from the University of Cincinnati, and a PhD in physical chemistry from the University of California, Berkeley.

== Career ==
In 1959, Narath started his career at Sandia National Laboratories. In 1984, he left Sandia to join AT&T as vice president of Government Systems. In 1987, he was elected into the National Academy of Engineering. In 1989, he came back to Sandia to serve as president. In 1991, he was awarded the George E. Pake Prize by the American Physical Society. In 1994, he was awarded Roosevelt Gold Medal for Science. In 1994, he signed an agreement providing $6 million to support collaboration between Sandia and Russian laboratories. In 1995, he left Sandia to become the President and Chief Operating Officer for the Energy and Environment Sector at Lockheed Martin Corporation in Bethesda, Maryland. He retired in 1998.
