= Mohan Kalkunte =

American electrical engineer

Mohan Kalkunte is an electrical engineer with Broadcom Corporation in San Jose, California. He was named a Fellow of the Institute of Electrical and Electronics Engineers (IEEE) in 2015 for his contributions to Ethernet switching architectures and merchant-switching silicon. In 2025, Kalkunte was elected to the National Academy of Engineering.
