= James C. McGroddy =

American physicist

James C McGroddy
- Born: April 6, 1937 (age 89); New York City, New York
- Education: BS St. Joseph's College - St. Joseph’s University, Philadelphia, PA; PhD University of Maryland, College Park 1964
- Employer: IBM
- Awards: National Academy of Engineering (1991); American Physical Society George E. Pake Prize (1995); IEEE Frederik Philips Award (1995)

James C. McGroddy is an American physicist. His early focus was on the electronic structure of metals. His Ph.D. thesis title was "Polar Reflection Faraday Effects in Aluminum".

== Career ==
He joined IBM’s Thomas J. Watson Research Center in Yorktown Heights as a Research Staff Member in 1965.

In November 1977, he was named IBM Research Division Vice President of Semiconductor Science and technology.

In May 1989 he became IBM Director of IBM Research ("IBM Research Magazine", Summer 1989) and was responsible for IBM's Research Division, which consisted of approximately 3,500 employees at 5 main laboratories (Yorktown Heights, NY, Almaden CA, Zurich, Switzerland; Yamato, Japan; and Haifa, Israel). Soon after his appointment, he drove the effort to overhaul the patent process at IBM, leading the company become the largest producer of patents for the next 25 years and adding billions of dollars to the bottom line.

== Recognition ==
In 1991 he was elected a member of the US National Academy of Engineering

In 1995, he was the recipient of the American Physical Society's George E. Pake Prize.

In 1999 the American Physical Society International Prize for New Materials was renamed the James C. McGroddy Prize for New Materials and endowed by IBM.

== Retirement ==
McGroddy retired from IBM at the end of 1996. After his mandatory retirement from IBM at age 60, McGroddy's focus, beyond family, has been on three areas, mostly on a pro-bono basis: healthcare, education, and national security.

He served for many years on the Board, one year at each as Chair, at Phelps Hospital, formally known as Phelps Memorial Hospital Center, and at Stellaris Healthcare, a four-hospital network which he helped establish. He served for fifteen years as Board Chair of MIQS, Inc., a startup aimed at driving the implementation of person-centered, clinically focused electronic medical records, with a dominant focus on improving clinical quality, reimbursement playing a secondary role.

He consulted, lectured, and served as a visitor or advisor at multiple universities. For nine years he served on the Board of Trustees of his alma mater, St. Joseph’s. Based on his history with Denmark, he played a key role in the founding of the IT University of Copenhagen and chaired its Foresight Committee for a decade. Relative to national security, he served, often as chairperson, on multiple National Academy studies, topics including the effectiveness of the DoD’s use of information technology in military operations, and of the FBI’s project aimed at modernizing their IT infrastructure. Over the years he has consulted for, and served as a board member of, several publicly traded, as well as private, companies.
