= Andrew M. Weiner =

American electrical engineer, educator and researcher

OSA NAE NAI Andrew Marc Weiner
- Born: July 25, 1958; Boston, Massachusetts
- Died: February 13, 2024 (aged 65)
- Education: Massachusetts Institute of Technology (SB, 1979), (SM, 1981), (Sc.D., 1984)
- Known for: Pioneering work on programmable femtosecond pulse shaping using liquid crystal modulator arrays
- Awards: Hertz Foundation Doctoral Thesis Prize (1984); Bellcore Award of Excellence (1988); Adolph Lomb Medal (1990); Curtis McGraw Research Award (1997); International Commission for Optics Prize (1997); IEEE Photonics Society William Streifer Scientific Achievement Award (1999); Alexander von Humboldt Foundation Research Award for Senior U.S. Scientists (2000); Research Excellence Award from the Schools of Engineering (2003); Optical Society of America R. W. Wood Prize (2008); Provost's Outstanding Graduate Student Mentor Award (2008); IEEE Photonics Society Quantum Electronics Award (2011); Herbert Newby Mccoy Award (2013)
- Scientific career
- Fields: Ultrafast optics and optical signal processing
- Workplaces: Purdue University
- Thesis: Femtosecond Optical Pulse Generation and Dephasing Measurements in Condensed Matter (1984)

Andrew Marc Weiner OSA NAE NAI (Born July 25, 1958 – 2024) was an American electrical engineer, educator and researcher known for contributions to the fields of ultrafast optics and optical signal processing. He was the Scifres Family Distinguished Professor of Electrical and Computer Engineering at Purdue University.

== Career ==
Weiner received a Sc.D. in electrical engineering in 1984 from the Massachusetts Institute of Technology. Following graduation he joined Bellcore, then a premier telecommunications research and development company, eventually serving as Manager of Ultrafast Optics and Optical Signal Processing Research. In 1992, Weiner was appointed at professor rank at the School of Electrical and Computer Engineering at Purdue University.

Weiner's research in ultrafast optics focuses on the processing of extremely high-speed lightwave signals as well as their application to the generation and manipulation of ultrabroadband radio-frequency signals. He is most well-known for research on the development of Fourier synthesis methods for controlling the shape of femtosecond light pulses. These methods extend femtosecond pulse generation technology by providing the ability to engineer these pulses into complex phase- and amplitude-modulated ultrafast optical waveforms according to specification. Findings from Weiner's research have been applied in fiber optic networks and in ultrafast optical science laboratories around the world. Specific studies in recent years address quantum photonics, Kerr comb generation in on-chip microresonators, and microwave and millimeter wave photonics. Weiner authored the textbook Ultrafast Optics (Wiley, 2009), and served as editor in chief of Optics Express, the largest journal broadly covering optics and photonics, from 2013 to 2018.

== Awards and honors ==
In 2008, Weiner was elected to the U.S. National Academy of Engineering, "for contributions to the development of femtosecond optical-pulse shaping technology." He is a Fellow of the National Academy of Inventors (2016), the Optical Society of America (1990) and the Institute of Electrical and Electronics Engineers (IEEE) (1995). He received a National Security Science and Engineering Fellowship, now called the Vannevar Bush Faculty Fellowship, from the U.S. Department of Defense in 2009. He has received the Optical Society of America's Adolph Lomb Medal (1990) in recognition of his early career achievements, the International Commission for Optics Prize (1997), the Alexander von Humboldt Foundation Research Award for Senior U.S. Scientists (2000), the IEEE Photonics Society's Quantum Electronics Award (2011), and Optica's Charles Hard Townes Medal (2023). Weiner is the co-recipient (with Jonathan Heritage) of both the Optical Society of America's R. W. Wood Prize (2008) and the IEEE Photonics Society's William Streifer Scientific Achievement Award (1999). He was also recognized by Popular Science Magazine for one of the "Top 100 Inventions of 1988" for the 100-femtosecond all-optical switch.

Weiner has received numerous awards from Purdue University. He was awarded the Herbert Newby McCoy Award (2013), which is the most prestigious award given by the university in natural sciences. He is also the inaugural recipient of the College of Engineering's Research Award (2003). In recognition of his mentorship, Weiner received the Purdue University Provost's Award for Outstanding Graduate Mentor (2008) and the College of Engineering Mentorship Award (2014).

Weiner was a Hertz Fellow at MIT and a recipient of the Hertz Foundation Doctoral Thesis Prize.

In addition to his technical interests, Weiner has had a lifelong interest in martial arts, and holds black belt rank in Aikido and Judo.

== Publications ==
- Weiner, A. M. (2000). "Femtosecond pulse shaping using spatial light modulators". Review of Scientific Instruments. 71 (5): 1929–1960. Bibcode:2000RScI...71.1929W. doi:10.1063/1.1150614.
- Weiner, A. M.; Heritage, J. P.; Kirschner, E. M. (1988). "High-resolution femtosecond pulse shaping". Journal of the Optical Society of America B. 5 (8): 1563. Bibcode:1988JOSAB...5.1563W. CiteSeerX 10.1.1.463.8549. doi:10.1364/JOSAB.5.001563.
- Weiner, A.M.; Leaird, D.E.; Patel, J.S.; Wullert, J.R. (1992). "Programmable shaping of femtosecond optical pulses by use of 128-element liquid crystal phase modulator". IEEE Journal of Quantum Electronics. 28 (4): 908–920. Bibcode:1992IJQE...28..908W. doi:10.1109/3.135209.
- Salehi, J.A.; Weiner, A.M.; Heritage, J.P. (1990). "Coherent ultrashort light pulse code-division multiple access communication systems". Journal of Lightwave Technology. 8 (3): 478–491. Bibcode:1990JLwT....8..478S. doi:10.1109/50.50743.
- Weiner, A. M.; Leaird, D. E.; Wiederrecht, G. P.; Nelson, K. A. (1990). "Femtosecond Pulse Sequences Used for Optical Manipulation of Molecular Motion". Science. 247 (4948): 1317–1319. Bibcode:1990Sci...247.1317W. doi:10.1126/science.247.4948.1317. PMID 17843793. S2CID 31688798.
- Aitchison, J. S.; Weiner, A. M.; Silberberg, Y.; Oliver, M. K.; Jackel, J. L.; Leaird, D. E.; Vogel, E. M.; Smith, P. W. E. (1990). "Observation of spatial optical solitons in a nonlinear glass waveguide". Optics Letters. 15 (9): 471–3. Bibcode:1990OptL...15..471A. doi:10.1364/OL.15.000471. PMID 19767979.
- Jiang, Zhi; Huang, Chen-Bin; Leaird, Daniel E.; Weiner, Andrew M. (2007). "Optical arbitrary waveform processing of more than 100 spectral comb lines". Nature Photonics. 1 (8): 463–467. Bibcode:2007NaPho...1..463J. doi:10.1038/nphoton.2007.139.
- Ferdous, Fahmida; Miao, Houxun; Leaird, Daniel E.; Srinivasan, Kartik; Wang, Jian; Chen, Lei; Varghese, Leo Tom; Weiner, Andrew M. (2011). "Spectral line-by-line pulse shaping of on-chip microresonator frequency combs". Nature Photonics. 5 (12): 770–776. arXiv:1103.2330. Bibcode:2011NaPho...5..770F. doi:10.1038/nphoton.2011.255. S2CID 6989904.
- Weiner, Andrew M. (2011). "Ultrafast optical pulse shaping: A tutorial review". Optics Communications. 284 (15): 3669–3692. Bibcode:2011OptCo.284.3669W. doi:10.1016/j.optcom.2011.03.084.
- Fan, L.; Wang, J.; Varghese, L. T.; Shen, H.; Niu, B.; Xuan, Y.; Weiner, A. M.; Qi, M. (2012). "An All-Silicon Passive Optical Diode". Science. 335 (6067): 447–450. Bibcode:2012Sci...335..447F. doi:10.1126/science.1214383. PMC 5563475. PMID 22194410.
- Weiner, A. M.; Heritage, J. P.; Hawkins, R. J.; Thurston, R. N.; Kirschner, E. M.; Leaird, D. E.; Tomlinson, W. J. (1988). "Experimental Observation of the Fundamental Dark Soliton in Optical Fibers". Physical Review Letters. 61 (21): 2445–2448. Bibcode:1988PhRvL..61.2445W. doi:10.1103/PhysRevLett.61.2445. PMID 10039120.
- Wu, Rui; Supradeepa, V. R.; Long, Christopher M.; Leaird, Daniel E.; Weiner, Andrew M. (2010). "Generation of very flat optical frequency combs from continuous-wave lasers using cascaded intensity and phase modulators driven by tailored radio frequency waveforms". Optics Letters. 35 (19): 3234–6. arXiv:1005.5373. Bibcode:2010OptL...35.3234W. doi:10.1364/OL.35.003234. PMID 20890344. S2CID 5852501.
- Lin, I.S.; McKinney, J.D.; Weiner, A.M. (2005). "Photonic synthesis of broadband microwave arbitrary waveforms applicable to ultra-wideband communication". IEEE Microwave and Wireless Components Letters. 15 (4): 226–228. doi:10.1109/LMWC.2005.845698. S2CID 26298002.
- Xue, Xiaoxiao; Xuan, Yi; Liu, Yang; Wang, Pei-Hsun; Chen, Steven; Wang, Jian; Leaird, Dan E.; Qi, Minghao; Weiner, Andrew M. (2015). "Mode-locked dark pulse Kerr combs in normal-dispersion microresonators". Nature Photonics. 9 (9): 594–600. arXiv:1404.2865. Bibcode:2015NaPho...9..594X. doi:10.1038/nphoton.2015.137. S2CID 120507153.
