= List of Union College alumni =

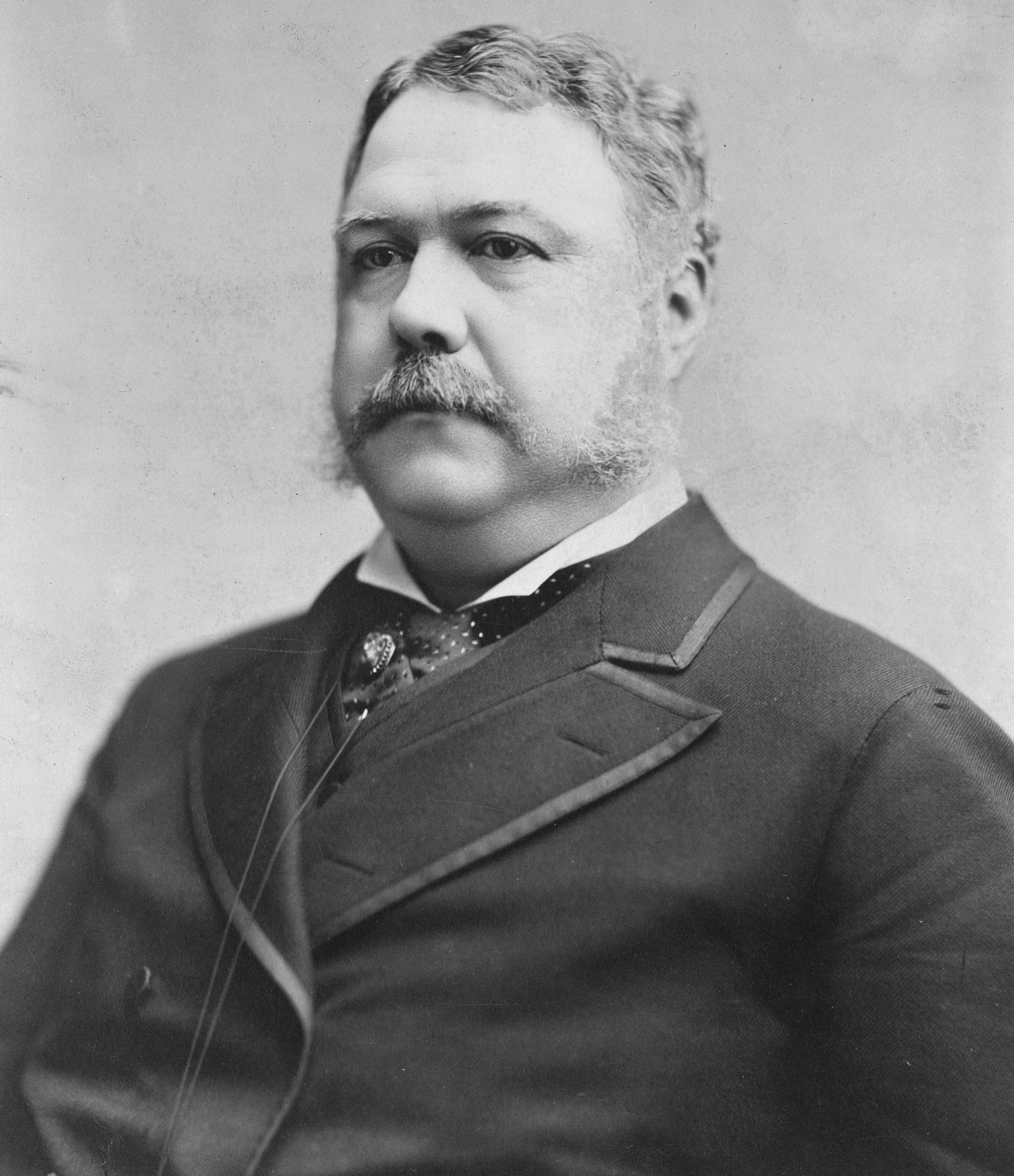
Chester A. Arthur, 21st president of the United States

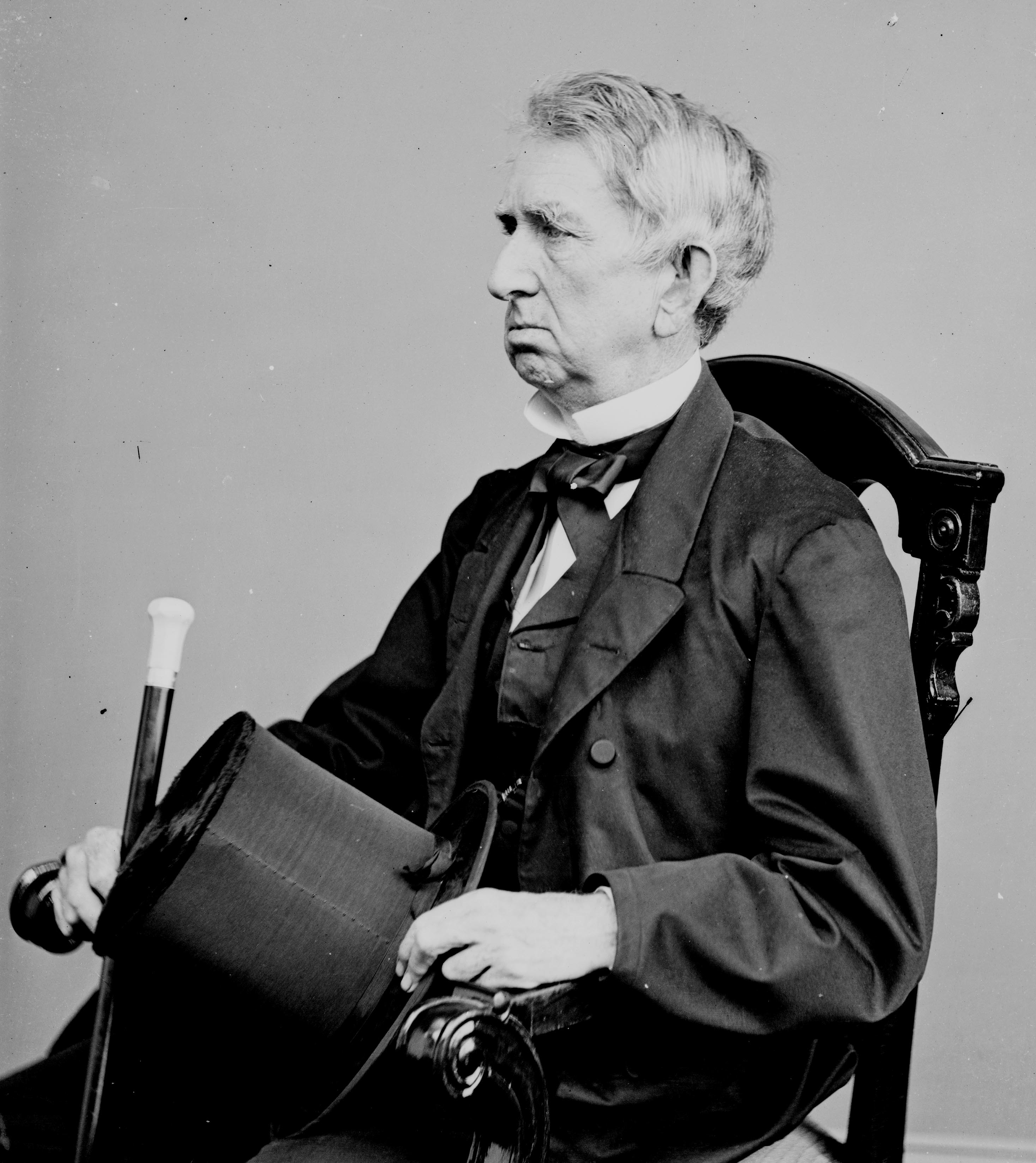
William H. Seward, U.S. secretary of state under Lincoln and Johnson

This list of Union College alumni includes graduates of Union College in Schenectady, New York, United States who have achieved some notability or influence in the public or private spheres. Such a list is necessarily selective, and therefore subjective.

== Alumni list ==
Name	Year	Notability	Reference
Morris S. Miller	1798	Member of the United States House of Representatives	
Walter Case	1799	Member of the United States House of Representatives	
John Savage	1799	Member of the United States House of Representatives	
John Cramer	1801	Member of the United States House of Representatives	
John B. Yates	1802	Member of the United States House of Representatives	
Abraham Bockee	1803	Member of the United States House of Representatives	
James M. Matthews	1803	First chancellor of New York University	
John W. Taylor	1803	Speaker of the United States House of Representatives (two terms)	
Thomas Church Brownell	1804	President of Washington College (Trinity College)	
Harmanus Peek	1804	Member of the United States House of Representatives	
John C. Spencer	1806	Member of the United States House of Representatives; U.S. secretary of war; U.S. secretary of the treasury	
Theodric Romeyn Beck	1807	Author of pioneering Elements of Medical Jurisprudence (1823)	
Adam Empie	1807	President of The College of William & Mary	
John Watts Cady	1808	Member of the United States House of Representatives	
Gideon Hawley	1809	First New York state superintendent of Common Schools; regent of the State University of New York; "father of the New York State common school system"	
John F. Schermerhorn	1809	Missionary; appointed Indian commissioner by Andrew Jackson	
Alfred Conkling	1810	Member of the United States House of Representatives; federal judge; United States minister to Mexico	
William Kendall Fuller	1810	Member of the United States House of Representatives	
John Maynard	1810	Member of the United States House of Representatives	
Abraham Maus Schermerhorn	1810	Member of the United States House of Representatives	
Charles Borland, Jr.	1811	Member of the United States House of Representatives	
Nicholas F. Beck	1813	Adjutant general of New York (1825–1830)	
Francis Wayland	1813	President of Brown University (1827–1855)	
George Washington Gale	1814	Founder of the Oneida Institute and Knox College; namesake of Galesburg, Illinois	
Richard M. Blatchford	1815	Secretary to William H. Seward; New York Central Park commissioner	
Gilbert Morgan	1815	President of Western University of Pennsylvania, Edgeworth Female Seminary, Harmony Female College	
Dudley Selden	1815	Member of the United States House of Representatives	
Nathaniel Pitcher Tallmadge	1815	Member of the United States Senate	
Henry Booth Cowles	1816	Member of the United States House of Representatives	
Sidney Breese	1818	Member of the United States Senate; author of landmark judicial decisions on state and national economic regulation	
George Washington Doane	1818	Episcopal bishop of New Jersey	
Augustus Seymour Porter	1818	Member of the United States Senate	
Alonzo Potter	1818	Episcopal bishop of Pennsylvania	
Charles Rogers	1818	Member of the United States House of Representatives	
John Van Buren	1818	Member of the United States House of Representatives	
Robert J. Breckinridge	1819	President of Jefferson College; superintendent of Public Instruction for Kentucky	
Joseph William Chinn	1819	Member of the United States House of Representatives	
James Irvine	1819	President of Ohio University	
Andrew W. Loomis	1819	Member of the United States House of Representatives	
David Stewart	1819	Member of the United States Senate	
Laurens Perseus Hickok	1820	Educator; author; president of Union College	
Archibald L. Linn	1820	Member of the United States House of Representatives	
William H. Seward	1820	Governor of New York; member of the United States Senate; United States secretary of state	
George A. Starkweather	1819	Member of the United States House of Representatives	
Nathaniel Boyden	1821	Member of the United States House of Representatives	
Edward Curtis	1821	Member of the United States House of Representatives	
William Montague Ferry	1821	Presbyterian minister, missionary, and community leader; founded several settlements in Ottawa County, Michigan	
Hiram Gray	1821	Member of the United States House of Representatives	
Sherlock J. Andrews	1821	Member of the United States House of Representatives	
John Williamson Nevin	1821	President of Franklin & Marshall College	
Gideon Hard	1822	Member of the United States House of Representatives	
Webster Matthew H.	1822	Adjutant General of New York	
Albert S. White	1822	Member of the United States House of Representatives; member of the United States Senate	
David P. Brewster	1823	Member of the United States House of Representatives	
Chesselden Ellis	1823	Member of the United States House of Representatives	
John A. Lott	1823	Member of the New York State Senate and the New York State Assembly; justice of the New York Superior Court	
Stephen Alexander	1824	Astronomer; original member of the United States National Academy of Sciences	
Charles Goodyear	1824	Member of the United States House of Representatives	
Ira Harris	1824	Member of the United States Senate; lawyer, judge, educator	
Charles J. Jenkins	1824	Governor of Georgia	
Josiah Sutherland	1824	Member of the United States House of Representatives	
Bradford Ripley Wood	1824	Member of the United States House of Representatives	
Samuel Dickson	1825	Member of the United States House of Representatives	
Amasa J. Parker	1825	Member of the United States House of Representatives; regent of the State University of New York; justice of the New York State Supreme Court; a founder of Albany Law School	
John F. McLaren	1825	President of Western University of Pennsylvania	
Henry Philip Tappan	1825	First official president of the University of Michigan (1852–1863)	
George Emlen Hare	1826	Dean of the Philadelphia Divinity School	
Horatio Potter	1826	Episcopal bishop in the Diocese of New York; founded the Cathedral of Saint John the Divine, New York	
Thomas Fielder Bowie	1827	Member of the United States House of Representatives	
M. Lindley Lee	1827	Member of the United States House of Representatives	
Samuel W. Beall	1827	Explorer; Indian agent; lieutenant governor of Wisconsin; one of the founders of Denver	
William W. Campbell	1827	Member of the United States House of Representatives; justice of the Superior Court of New York City; justice of the New York State Supreme Court; historian	
Levi Hubbell	1827	Wisconsin Supreme Court	
Preston King	1827	Member of the United States Senate	
Erasmus D. MacMaster	1827	President of Hanover College	
Virgil Delphini Parris	1827	Member of the United States House of Representatives	
Rufus Wheeler Peckham	1827	Member of the United States House of Representatives	
Leonard Woods	1827	President of Bowdoin College (1839–1866)	
Ward Hunt	1828	Mayor of Utica, New York; associate justice of the United States Supreme Court (1872–1882)	
Joseph G. Masten	1828	Mayor of Buffalo, New York; judge of the New York Superior Court	
Robert A. Toombs	1828	Member of the United States Senate; secretary of state for the Confederate States of America	
Joseph Alden	1828	President of the New York State Normal Institute; president of Jefferson College	
Israel T. Hatch	1829	Member of the United States House of Representatives	
John L. Wilson	1829	African missionary and explorer; author of Western Africa: Its History, Condition, and Prospects (1856)	
Leander Babcock	1830	Member of the United States House of Representatives	
Frank Hastings Hamilton	1830	Surgeon; president of the New York Society of Medical Jurisprudence; author of important medical texts	
Henry James	1830	Philosopher and author; father of Henry James (novelist) and William James (philosopher/psychologist)	
Henry S. Randall	1830	Historian; author of The Life of Thomas Jefferson (1858)	
Augustus Schell	1830	Lawyer; stock market manipulator; successor of William M. Tweed as Grand Sachem of the Tammany Society	
Squire Whipple	1830	"Father of American metal bridges"; civil engineer; inventor; bridge designer	
Orsamus H. Marshall	1831	Chancellor of the University of Buffalo	
Roswell Park	1831	President of Racine College	
Lyman Sanford	1831	Adjutant general of New York, judge of Schoharie County, New York	
Don A. J. Upham	1831	Mayor of Milwaukee	
Thomas Allen	1832	Member of the United States House of Representatives; railroad builder; printer to the Senate and House	
Edward Dorr Griffin Prime	1832	Religious journalist	
Joseph Mullin	1833	Member of the United States House of Representatives	
Daniel Pratt	1835	New York State Supreme Court justice	
George F. Comstock	1834	Lawyer; solicitor of the United States Treasury; chief judge of the New York State Court of Appeals	
Edmund Sears	1834	Clergyman; author; hymn writer ("It Came Upon the Midnight Clear," "Calm on the Listening Ears of Night")	
John Bigelow	1835	Consul-general to Paris during the Civil War; minister to France; founder of the New York Public Library	
John Wells	1835	Member of the United States House of Representatives	
Henry W. Halleck	1837	General-in-chief of the Union Armies	
Levi Augustus Mackey	1837	Member of the United States House of Representatives	
Edward Tuckerman	1837	Botanist; lichenologist; namesake of Tuckerman Ravine	
Clarence A. Walworth	1838	Catholic priest; author; historian	
Austin Blair	1839	Member of the United States House of Representatives; governor of Michigan	
Joel T. Headley	1839	New York secretary of state; historian and author	
John Upfold Pettit	1839	Member of the United States House of Representatives	
Leonard Jerome	1839	New York City financier and grandfather of Winston Churchill	
Lewis Henry Morgan	1840	Anthropologist; ethnologist; "father of American anthropology"	
John W. Cary	1842	Wisconsin state senator	
Charles C. Parry	1842	Botanist of the United States Department of Agriculture; explorer and botanist of the Rocky Mountains	
Clarkson N. Potter	1842	Member of the United States House of Representatives	
Franklin B. Hough	1843	Botanist; mineralogist; forester; historian of New York State; director of the United States Census; "father of American forestry"	
Charles Lewis Beale	1844	Member of the United States House of Representatives	
Alexander H. Rice	1844	Member of the United States House of Representatives; governor of Massachusetts and mayor of Boston	
Edward P. Allis	1845	International manufacturer; inventor	
Robert Earl	1845	Judge on the New York State Court of Appeals	
Daniel Hall	1845	Member and speaker of the Wisconsin State Assembly	
Daniel Bigelow	1846	Regent of the University of Washington; founder of the University of Puget Sound	
John Michael Carroll	1846	Member of the United States House of Representatives	
John M. Gregory	1846	President of the University of Illinois and Kalamazoo College	
John T. Hoffman	1846	Governor of New York	
Bradley Phillips	1846	Clergyman and member of the Wisconsin State Assembly	
Gabriel Bouck	1847	Member of the United States House of Representatives	
Chester A. Arthur	1848	Twenty-first president of the United States	
William James Stillman	1848	Journalist; artist; photographer; diplomat; American consul to Rome during the Civil War; American consul at Crete	
Hannibal Goodwin	1848	Inventor of roll film	
Charles C. Nott	1848	Chief justice of the United States Court of Claims	
Daniel Butterfield	1849	Civil War general; composer of revised "Taps" bugle call; Civil War chief of staff for General Joseph Hooker; Civil War chief of staff for General George Meade	
Frederick W. Seward	1849	Diplomat; journalist; son of William H. Seward; assistant secretary of state	
Allen Wright	1852	Governor, Choctaw Nation; author of English-Choctaw dictionary	
John F. Hartranft	1853	Governor of Pennsylvania	
Edward Tuckerman Potter	1853	Architect of the Nott Memorial; architect of Mark Twain's residence in Hartford, Connecticut	
William Clarke Whitford	1853	President of Milton College	
Orlow W. Chapman	1854	Solicitor general of the United States	
Edwin W. Rice	1854	Editor and author with the American Sunday School Union	
Sheldon Jackson	1855	Presbyterian missionary in the Western United States; first United States superintendent of Public Instruction in Alaska	
Philip S. Post	1855	Member of the United States House of Representatives	
Clement Hall Sinnickson	1855	Member of the United States House of Representatives	
William G. Donnan	1856	Member of the United States House of Representatives	
George W. Hough	1856	Astronomer; inventor of meteorological instruments; president of the World Congress on Astronomy and Astrophysics	
Seaman A. Knapp	1856	Pioneer in experimental agriculture and practical education; president of Iowa State University	
Fitz Hugh Ludlow	1856	Author; drug experimentalist; author of The Hasheesh Eater	
Seth L. Milliken	1856	Member of the United States House of Representatives	
Laurenus C. Seelye	1857	First president of Smith College; advocate for women's colleges	
Charles Horton Peck	1859	Mycologist; New York state botanist	
Elnathan Sweet	1859	New York state engineer and surveyor	
Warner Miller	1860	Member of the United States House of Representatives; member of the United States Senate	
Charles E. Patterson	1860	Speaker of the New York State Assembly	
Americus Vespucius Rice	1860	Member of the United States House of Representatives	
Chester Holcombe	1861	Missionary; diplomat; secretary of the United States Legation to China	
Thomas Jones Thorp	1861	Union Army officer	
Charles E. Smith	1861	United States minister to Russia; United States Postmaster General	
Ridgley C. Powers	1862	Governor of Mississippi	
Amasa J. Parker, Jr.	1863	New York state senator; Union College trustee; author of Banking Law of New York	
Charles Edward Pearce	1863	Member of the United States House of Representatives	
William Appleton Potter	1864	Architect; designed many Princeton University buildings; supervising architect of the United States Department of the Treasury	
Daniel Newton Lockwood	1865	Member of the United States House of Representatives	
Cady Staley	1865	President of Case Western Reserve University	
La Mott W. Rhodes	1866	Member of the New York State Assembly	
Edward Wemple	1866	Member of the United States House of Representatives; New York state comptroller	
Joseph M. Carey	1867	Attended as a member of the class of 1867; honorary LL.D., 1894; U.S. senator; U.S. representative; Wyoming governor; author of 1894's Carey Arid Lands Act (1894)	
Preston King	1827	Member of the United States House of Representatives; member of the United States Senate	
Franklin H. Giddings	1877	"Father of American sociology"	
Joseph E. Ransdell	1882	Member of the United States House of Representatives; member of the United States Senate from Louisiana; career ended by Huey Pierce Long, Jr.	
Wallace T. Foote	1885	Member of the United States House of Representatives	
Henry A. Van Alstyne	1893	New York state engineer and surveyor	
Fraser Metzger	1902	Clergyman, politician, college administrator	
Archibald Rutledge	1904	Educator, author	
Robert P. Patterson	1912	United States secretary of war	
George Stibitz	1927	One of the "fathers" of the modern digital computer	
John Schiller Wold	1938	Member of the United States House of Representatives	
Clare W. Graves	1940	Psychologist; developed theory of human development known as "emergent cyclical levels of existence theory"	
Gordon Gould	1941	Widely, but not universally, credited with the invention of the laser	
Armand V. Feigenbaum	1942	Businessman; developer of the concept of total quality management/control	
Stanley Green	1943	Historian of theatre and film; writer on music	
Gordon F. Newell	1945	Scientist in the field of applied mathematics; Gordon–Newell theorem named for him and colleague William J. Gordon	
Baruch S. Blumberg	1946	Nobel Prize in Medicine (1976)	
Elmer H. Antonsen	1947	Professor of Germanic Languages with a particular expertise in runology	
Herbert Freeman	1947	Computer Pioneer Award winner from the IEEE Computer Society; designer of the Sperry Corporation's first digital computer, the SPEEDAC	
Harry Mazer	1948	Author of books for children and young adults	
Eric Schmertz	1948	Law professor and labor arbitrator	
Richard Selzer	1948	Surgeon and author	
Hermann A. Haus	1949	Frederic Ives Medal; National Medal of Science	
David Markson	1950	Author, Wittgenstein's Mistress and The Ballad of Dingus Magee	
Herman W. Nickel	1951	Ambassador to South Africa	
John H. Ostrom	1951	Paleontologist	
Howard Simons	1951	Managing editor of The Washington Post	
Herbert Schmertz	1952	Vice president of Public Affairs for the Mobil Corporation	
Robert Chartoff	1955	Producer	
Neil Abercrombie	1959	Politician in Hawaii; member of the US House of Representatives (1986–87, 1991–2010) and 7th governor of Hawaii (2010–2014)	
George DiCenzo	1962	Character actor and acting teacher	
John H. Fenimore V	1963	Adjutant General of New York	
Alfred Sommer	1963	Ophthalmologist; discovered the benefits of Vitamin A for children deficient in this vitamin	
Alan Horn	1964	President and COO of Warner Bros. Entertainment	
Victor H. Fazio	1965	Member of the United States House of Representatives	
Douglas LaBier	1965	Psychologist; psychotherapist; writer; director of the Center for Adult Development	
Martin Jay	1965	Historian; critic	
Richard Fateman	1966	One of the developers of the Macsyma computer algebra system and the Franz Lisp system	
Michael Fuchs	1967	Executive producer for HBO	
Lamin Sanneh	1967	D. Willis James Professor of Missions and World Christianity at Yale Divinity School and professor of History at Yale University	
Kenneth Merchant	1968	Chair of Accountancy at the Leventhal School of Accounting, University of Southern California	
Jeffrey DeMunn	1969	Film and television actor	
Anderson Mazoka	1969	Zambian politician and president of the United Party for National Development, a leading opposition party	
Phil Alden Robinson	1971	Screenwriter; director	
Jim Tedisco	1972	New York State senator	
Kate White	1972	Author; editor	
Steven Zaloga	1973	American historian; defense consultant; author	
Andrea Barrett	1974	Author; National Book Award winner; MacArthur Fellow	
Mark J. Bennett	1976	Judge of the United States Court of Appeals for the Ninth Circuit	
John Kelly III	1976	Senior vice president and director of IBM Research	
Rich Templeton	1980	Chairman, president and CEO of Texas Instruments	
David Stern	1982	Philanthropist; activist; CEO of Equal Justice Works and president of the Stern Family Fund	
David B. Haviland	1983	Physics professor, member of the Royal Swedish Academy of Sciences and Nobel Committee for Physics	
Ilene Landress	1983	Emmy-award winning television and film producer; co-executive producer of HBO's The Sopranos	
Sue Goldie	1984	MacArthur Fellow	
Devin Wenig	1988	President and CEO of eBay	
Chris Sheridan	1989	Writer and television producer noted for his work on Family Guy	
Andy Miller	1990	Corporate executive and entrepreneur	
Dylan Ratigan	1994	Television journalist; host of MSNBC's Morning Meeting with Dylan Ratigan	
Nikki Stone	1995	Olympian; first American to win a gold medal in inverted aerial skiing; motivational speaker	
Jennifer Lawless	1997	Commonwealth Professor of Politics at the University of Virginia	
Rawson Marshall Thurber	1997	Screenwriter; director	
Ben Schwartz	2003	Actor and comedian, known for House of Lies and Parks and Recreation	
Phillip Chorba	2005	Actor, on cast of Silver Linings and Concussion	
Joanna Stern	2006	Senior personal technology columnist at the Wall Street Journal	
Nancy Borowick	2007	Artist, photographer, and author	
Shayne Gostisbehere	2015	NHL defenseman for the Carolina Hurricanes	
Jake Fishman	2019	American-Israeli baseball player for the Miami Marlins and for Team Israel	
Emma White	2019	Former professional racing cyclist and Olympic bronze medalist	

== Select gallery ==
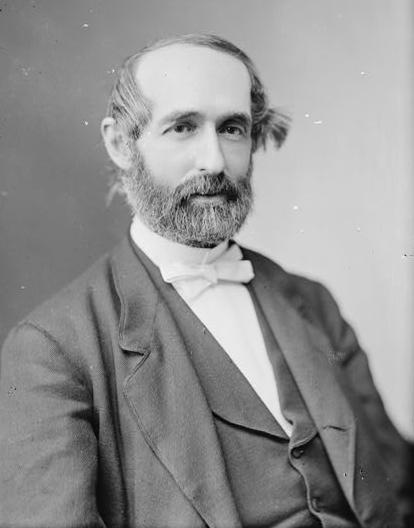
Frederick W. Seward, assistant U.S. secretary of state under Lincoln and Johnson

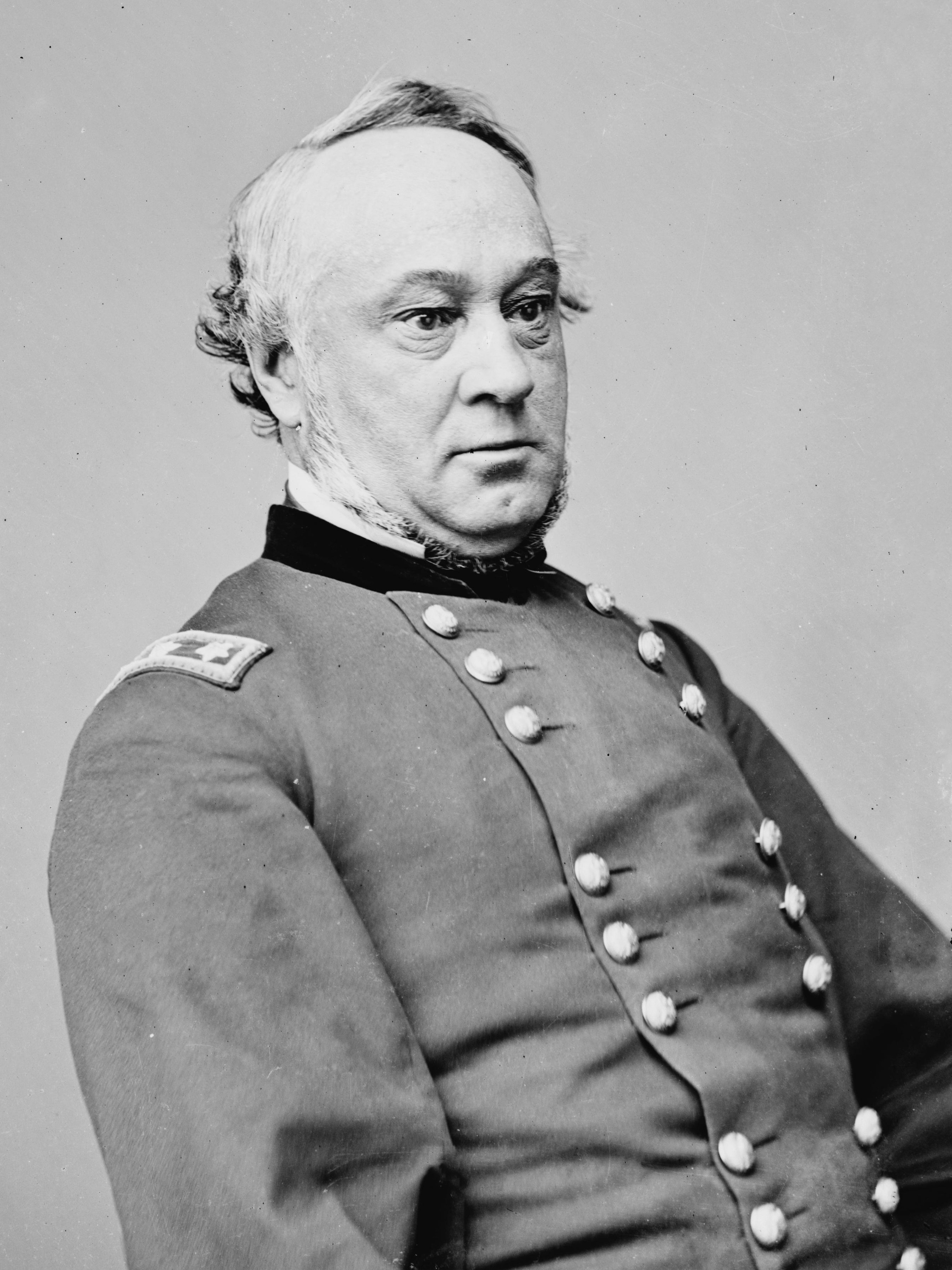
Henry W. Halleck, general-in-chief of the Union Armies

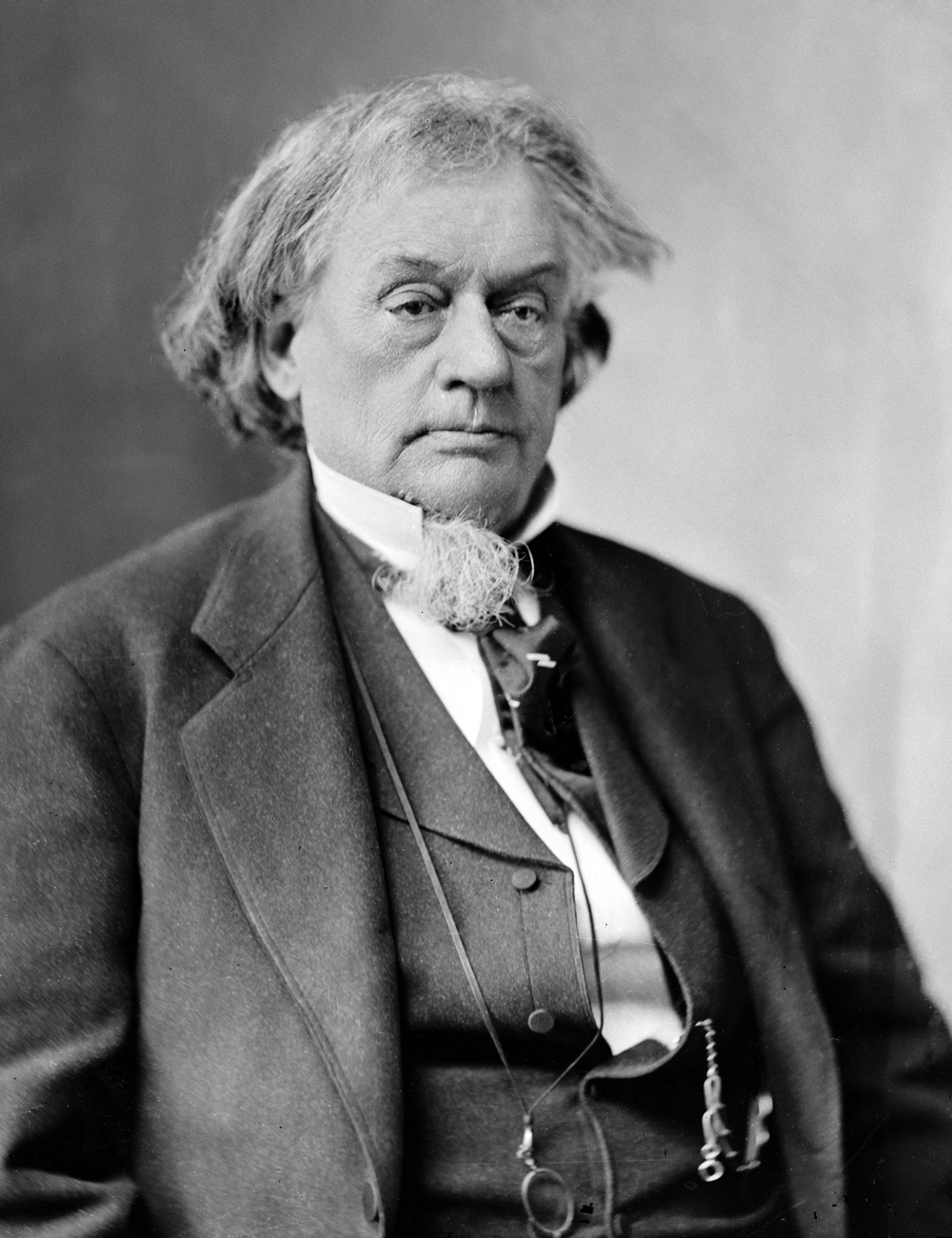
Robert Toombs, first Confederate States secretary of state

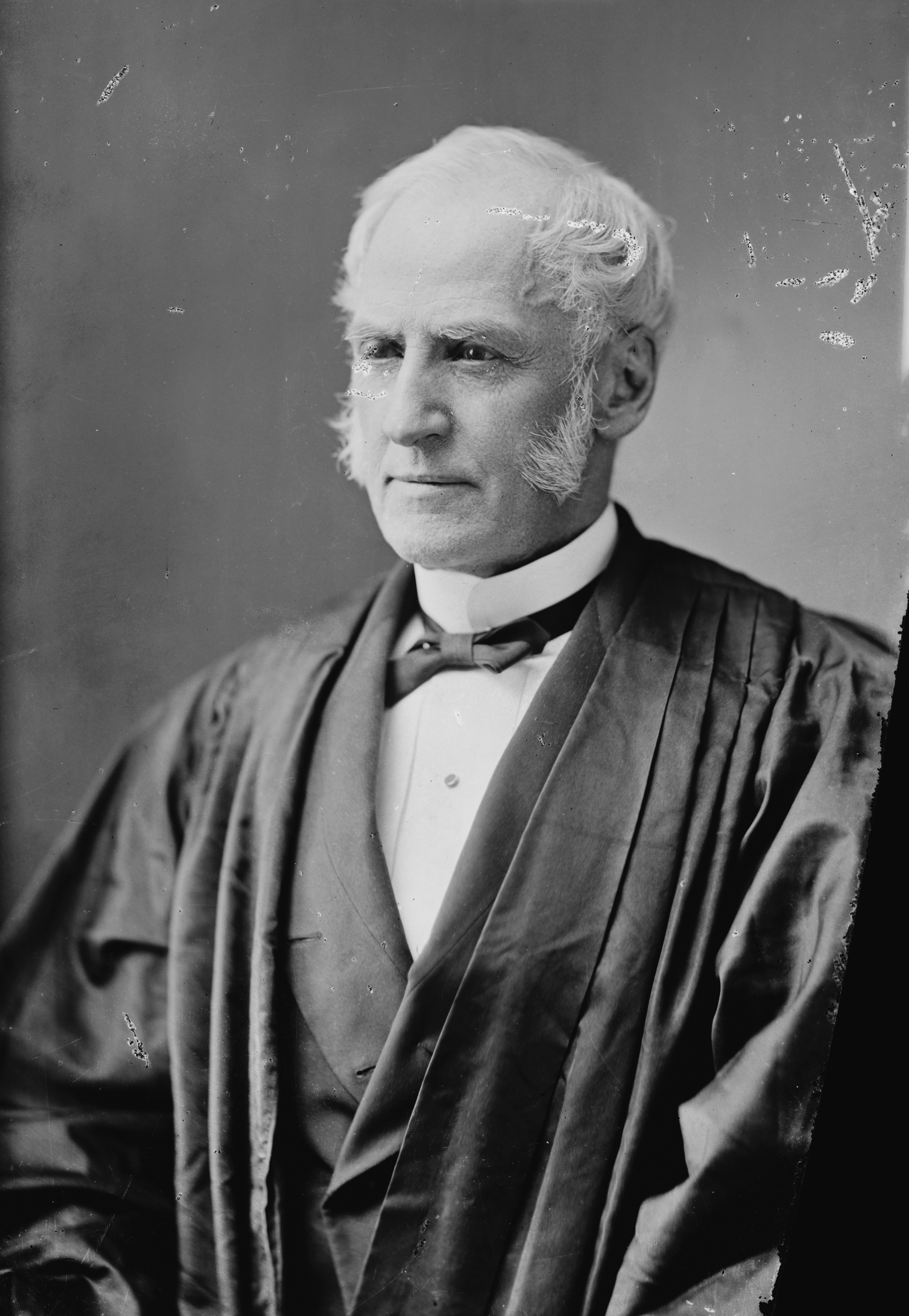
Ward Hunt, associate justice of the U.S. Supreme Court, 1873–1882

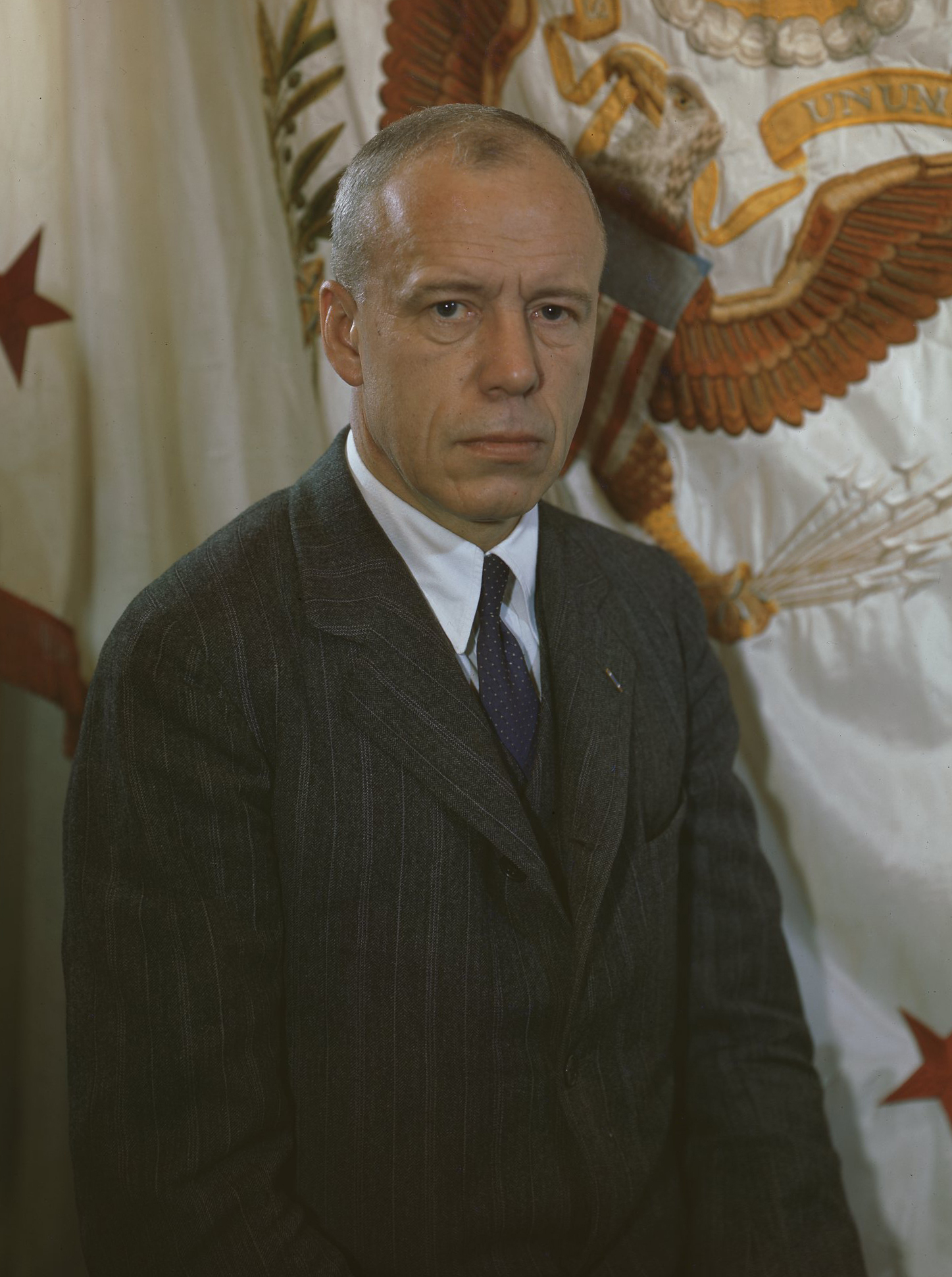
Robert P. Patterson, U.S. secretary of war under Harry S. Truman

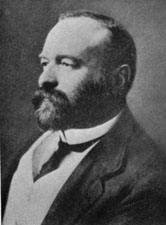
Franklin H. Giddings, "father of American sociology"

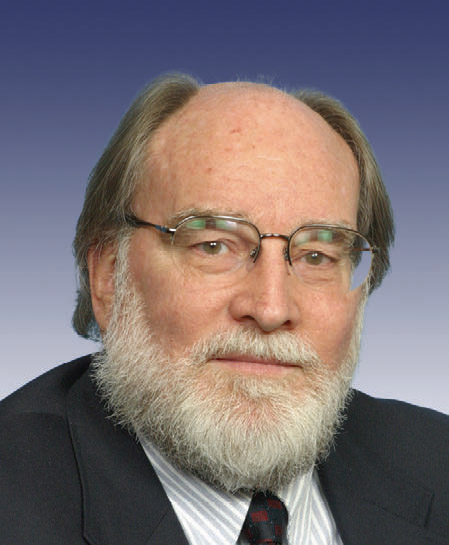
Neil Abercrombie, seventh governor of Hawaii

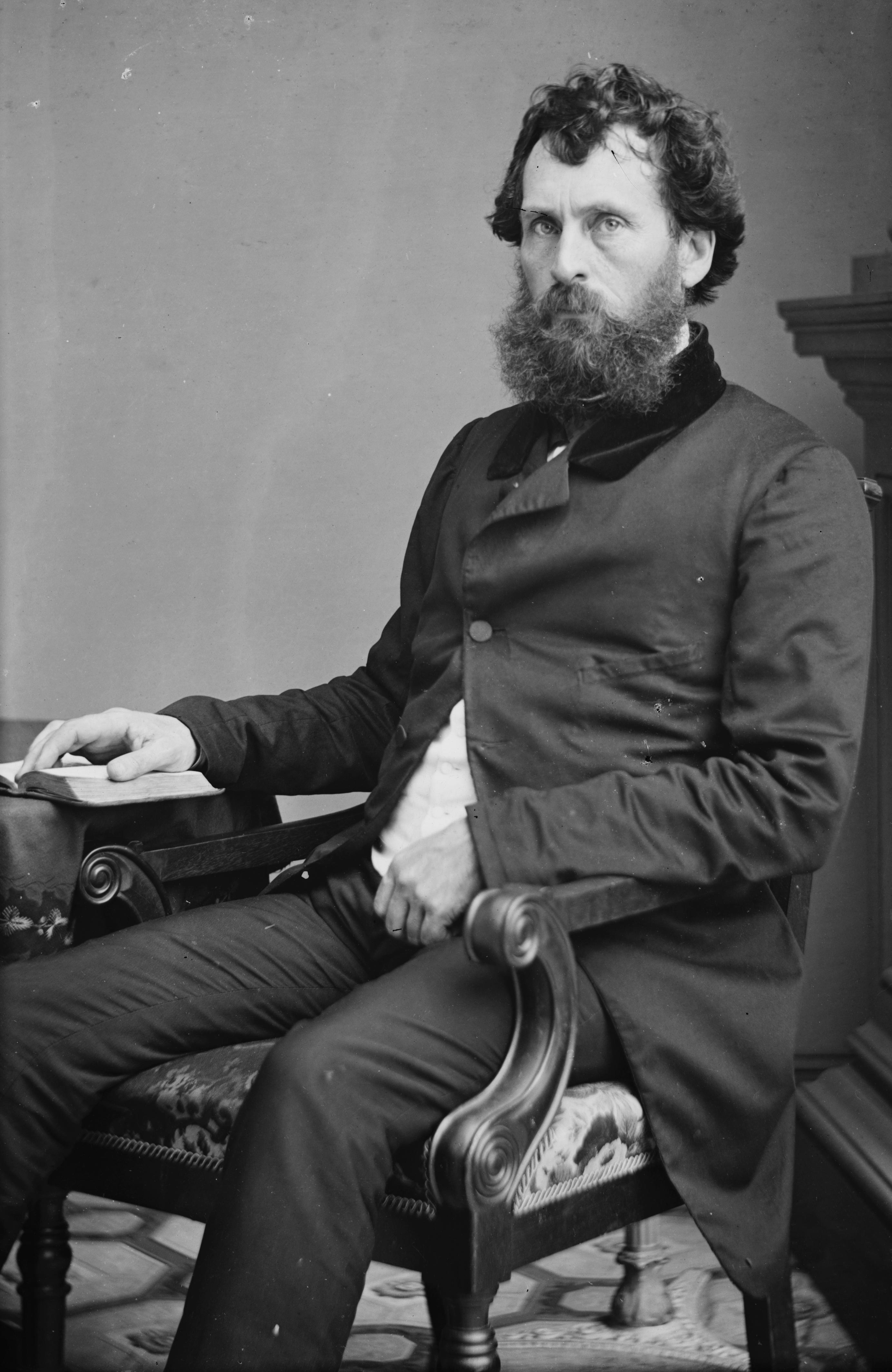
John Bigelow, minister to France under Lincoln

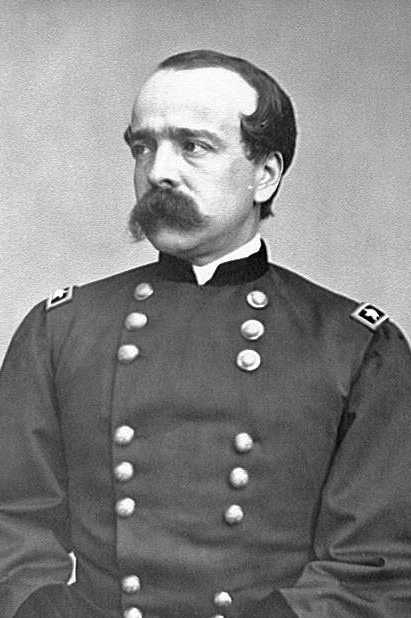
Daniel Butterfield, Union general in the Civil War

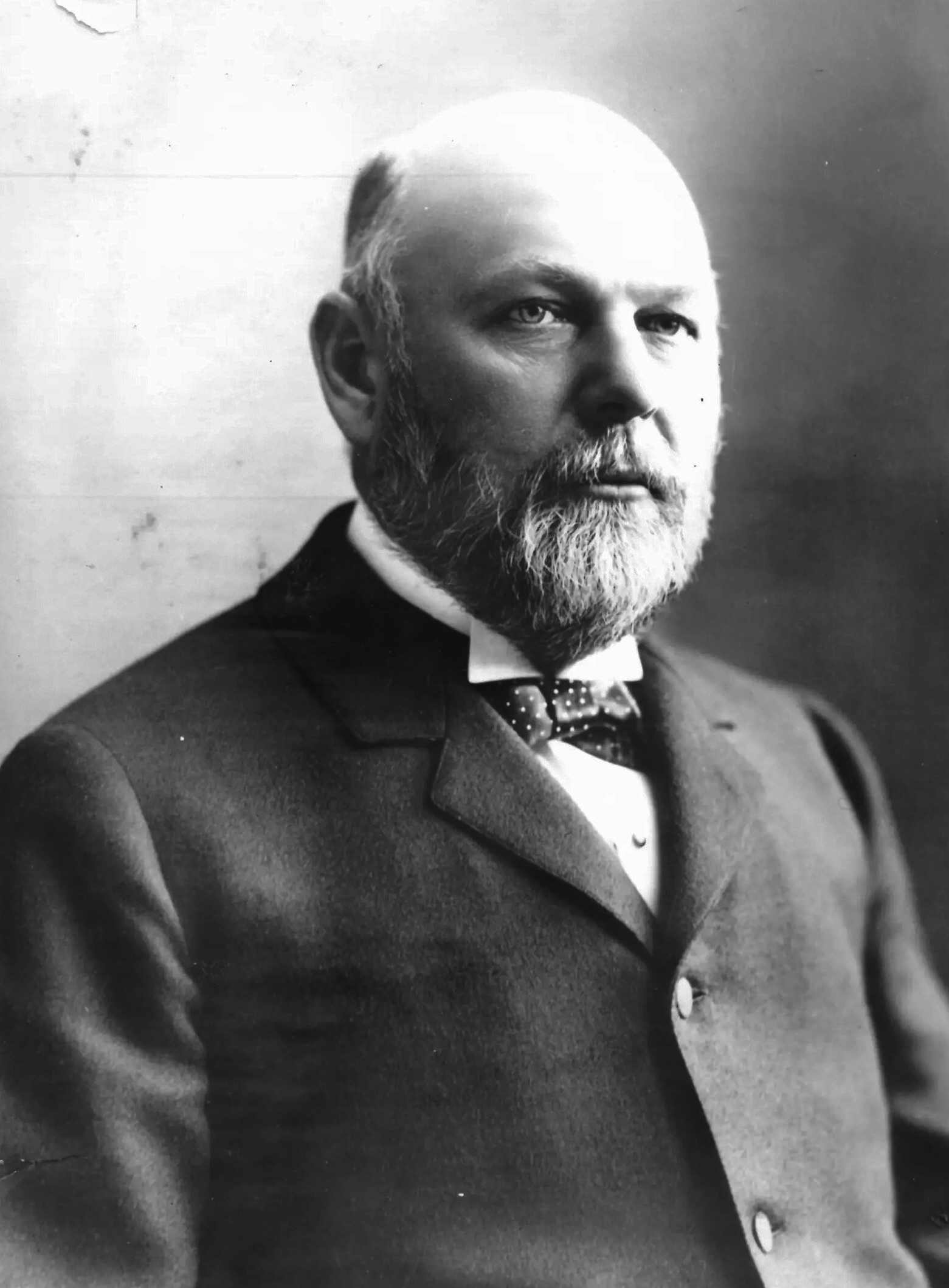
Joseph M. Carey, governor of Wyoming, 1911–1915

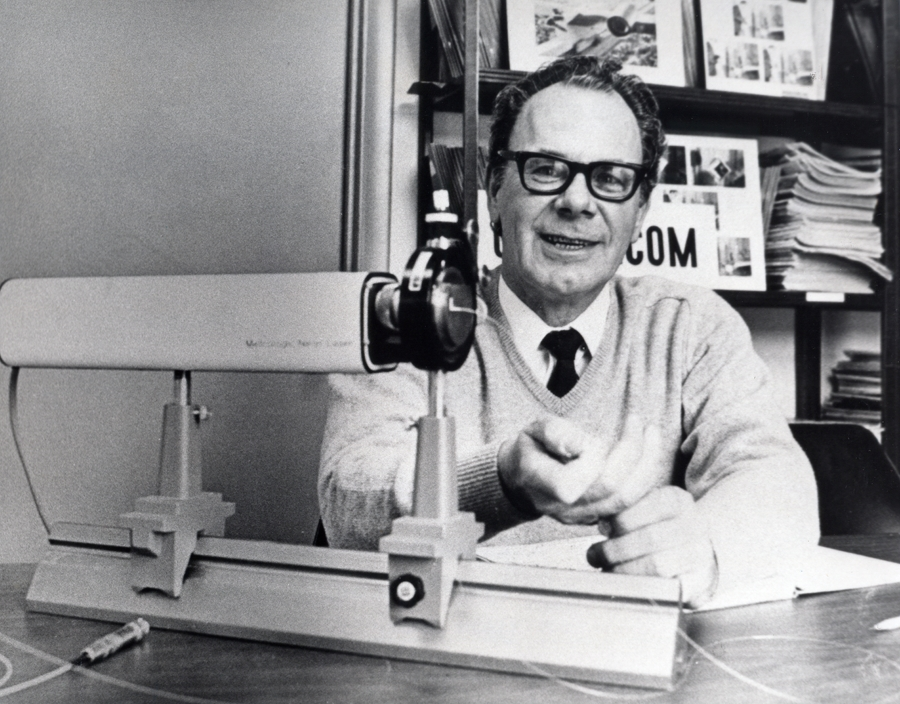
Gordon Gould, developer of the laser

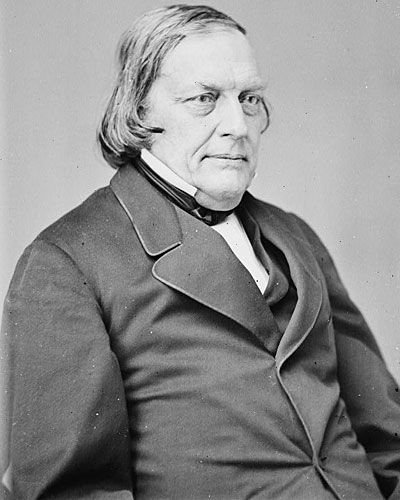
Ira Harris, member of the U.S. Senate, 1861–1867

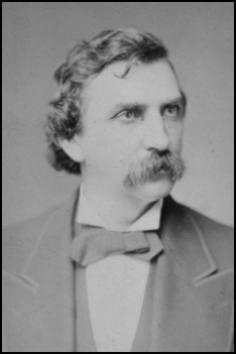
John F. Hartranft, governor of Pennsylvania, 1873–1879

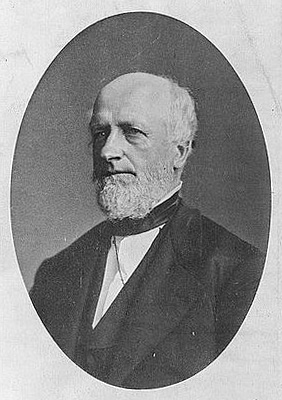
Franklin B. Hough, first chief of the US Division of Forestry

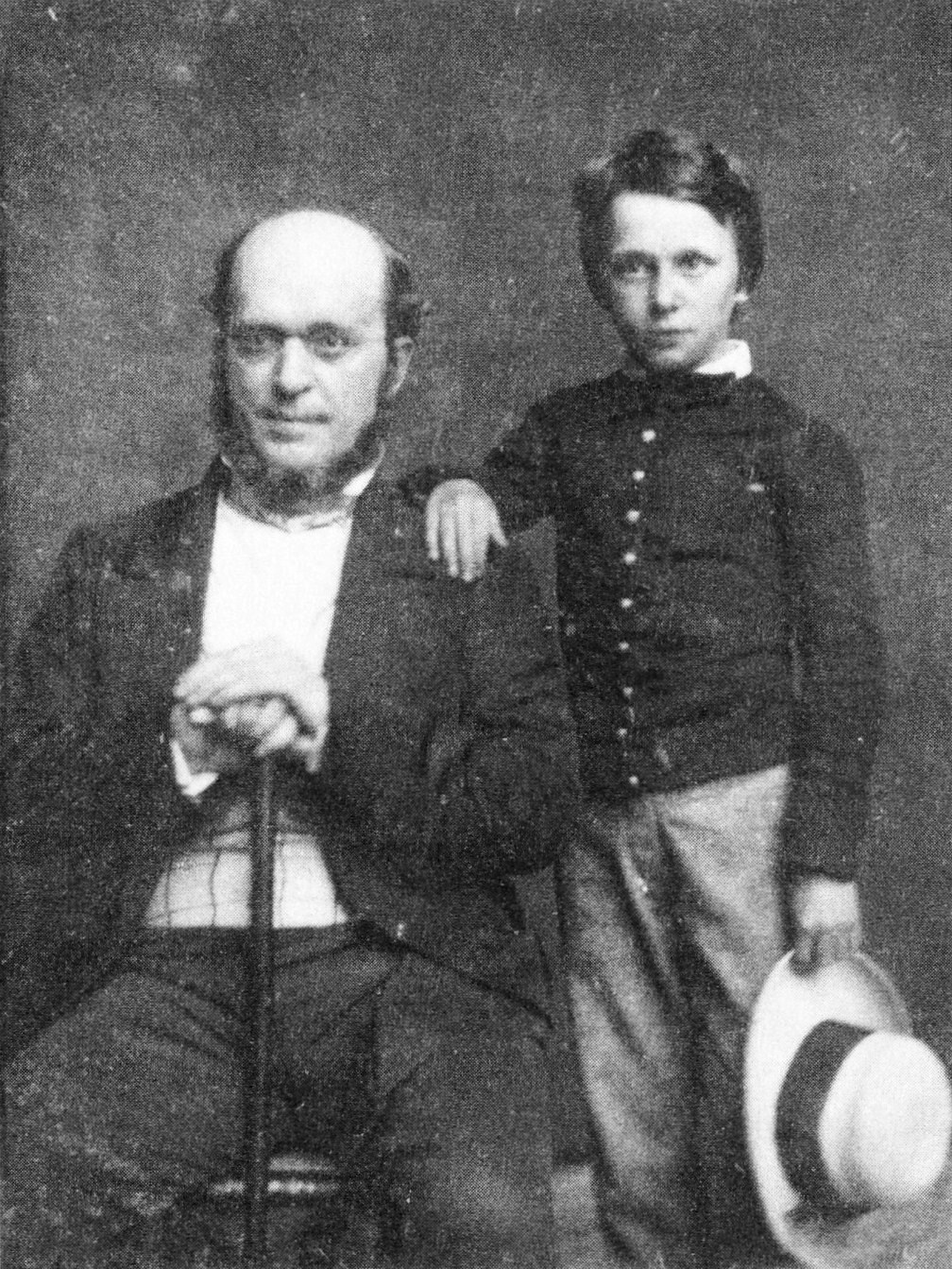
Henry James, Sr., philosopher and author

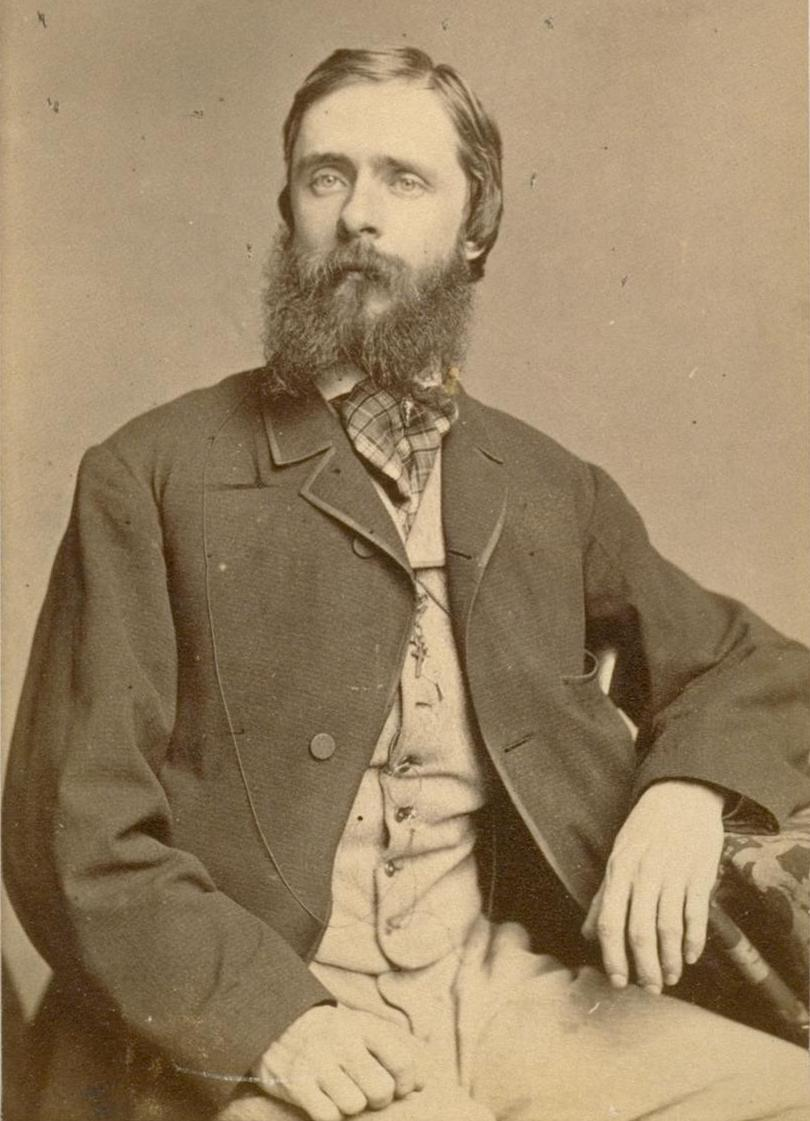
Fitz Hugh Ludlow, author of The Hasheesh Eater and Union's alma mater

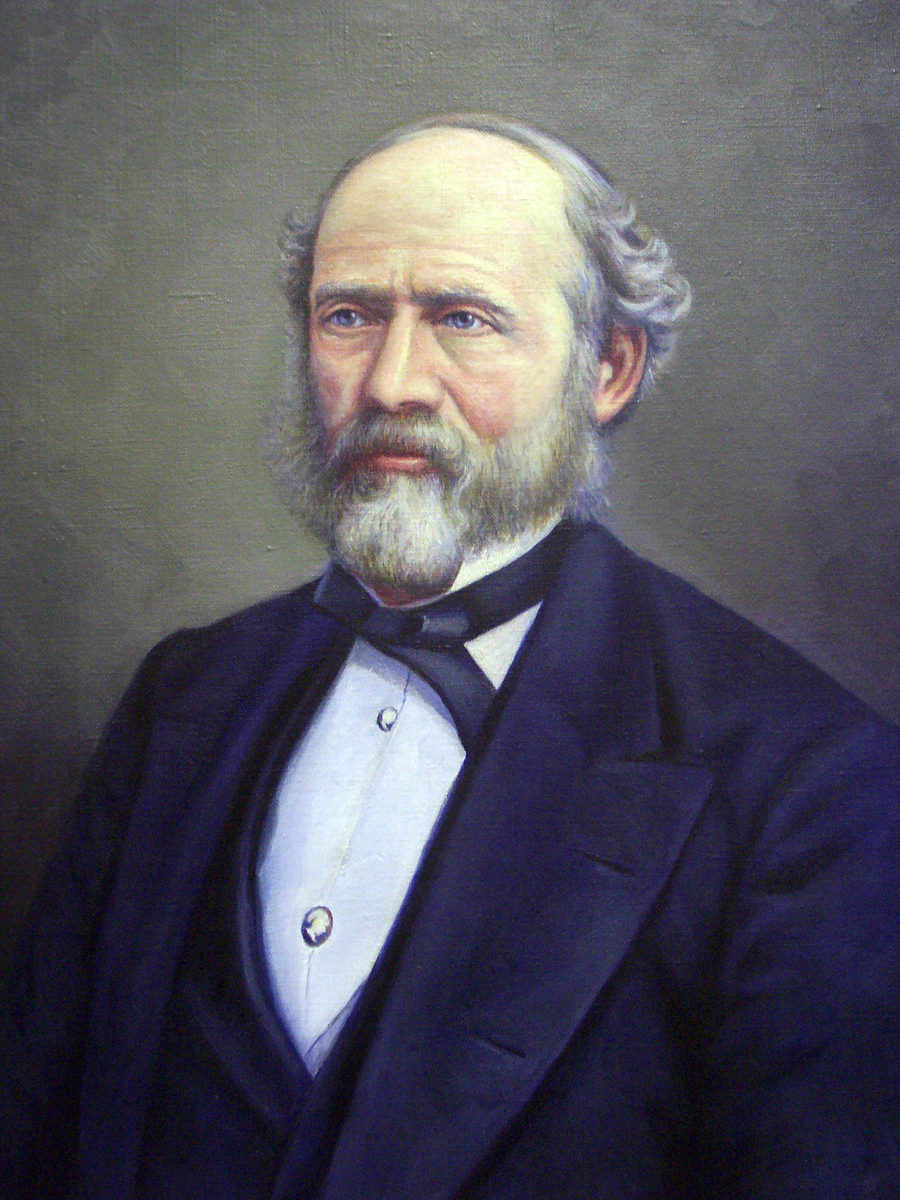
Lewis Henry Morgan, "father of American anthropology"

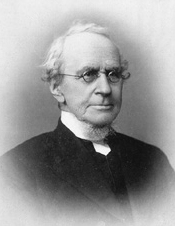
John W. Nevin, president of Franklin and Marshall College, 1866–1876

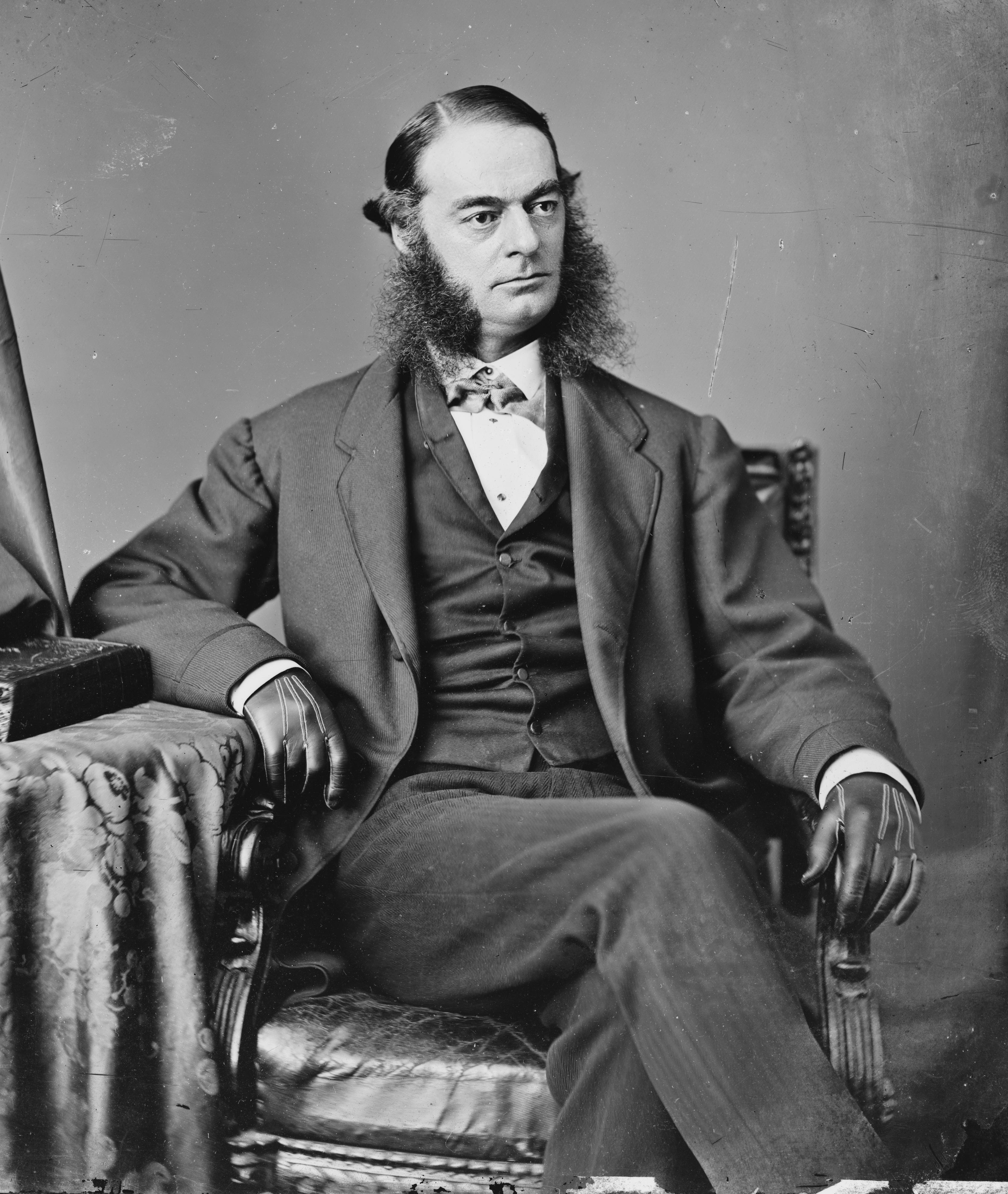
Clarkson N. Potter, president of the American Bar Association (1881–1882) and US congressman from New York (1869–1875)

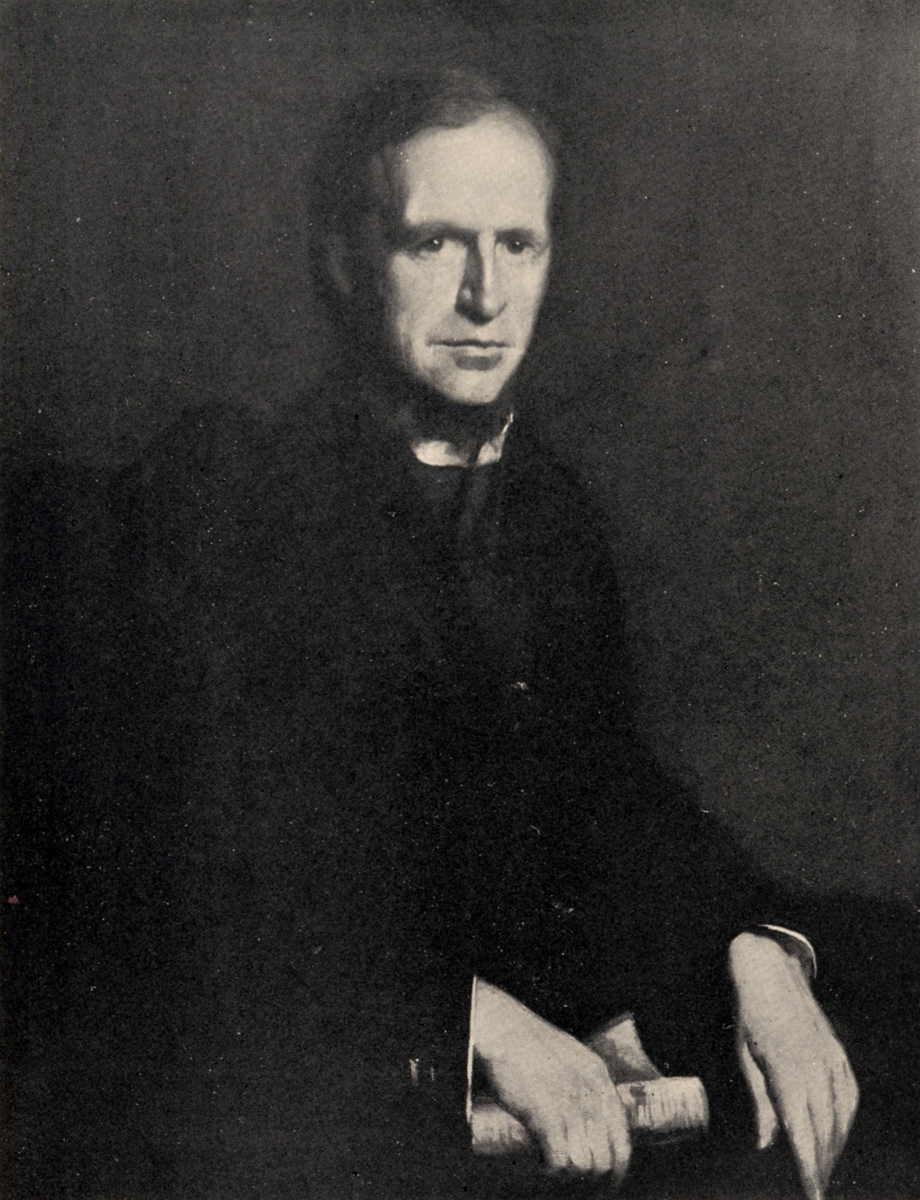
Laurenus C. Seelye, first president of Smith College, 1875–1910

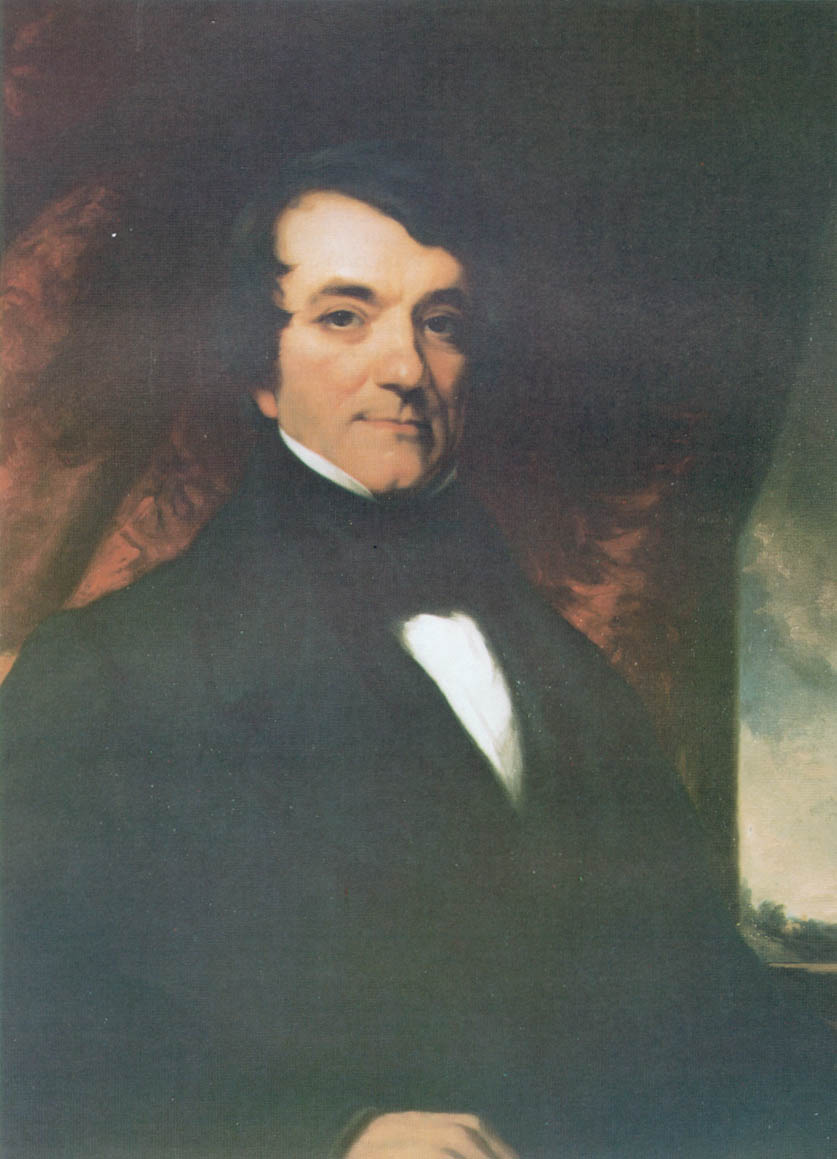
John Canfield Spencer, U.S. secretary of war and U.S. secretary of the treasury under President John Tyler

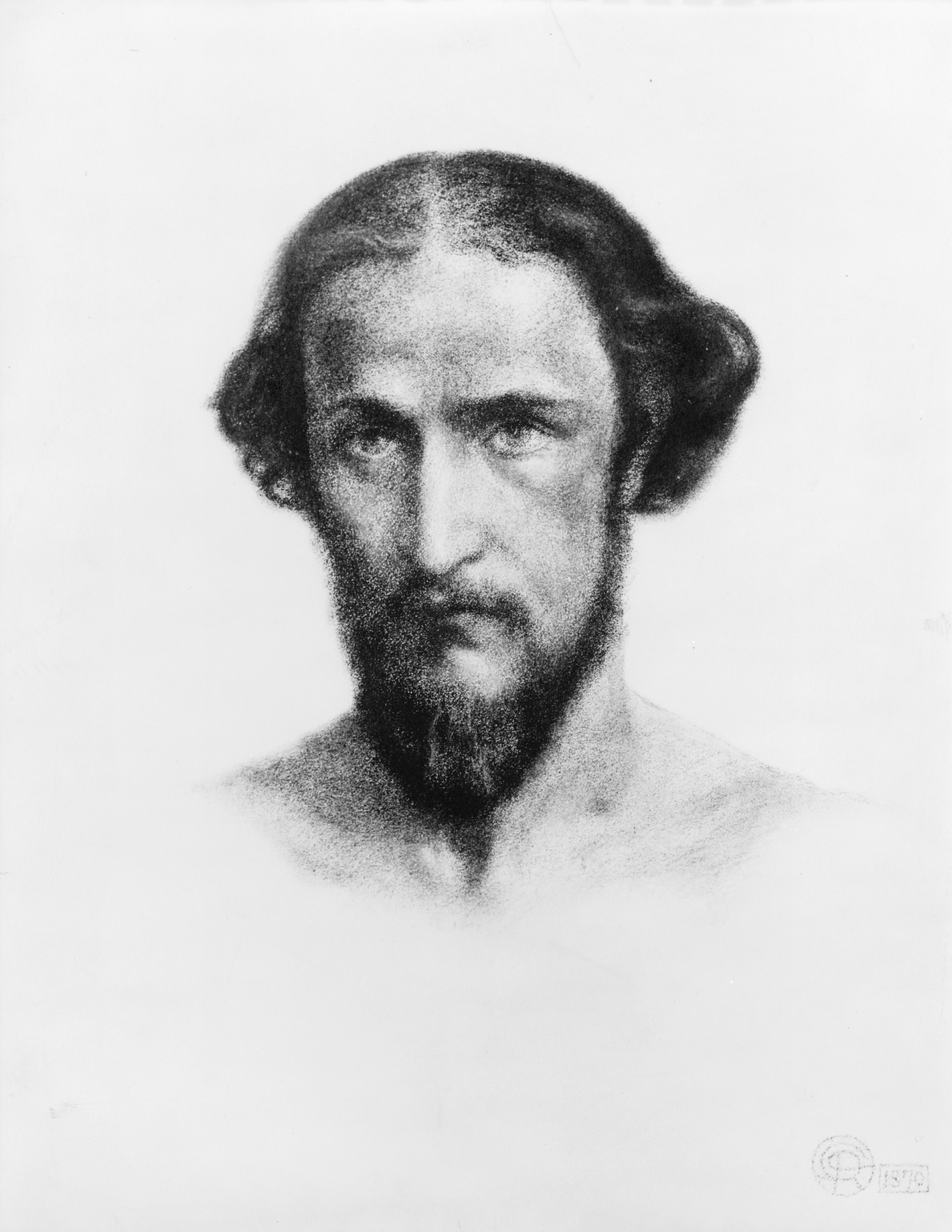
William Stillman, journalist, artist, photographer, and diplomat

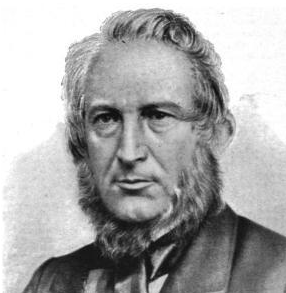
Henry Philip Tappan, first president of the University of Michigan, 1852–1863

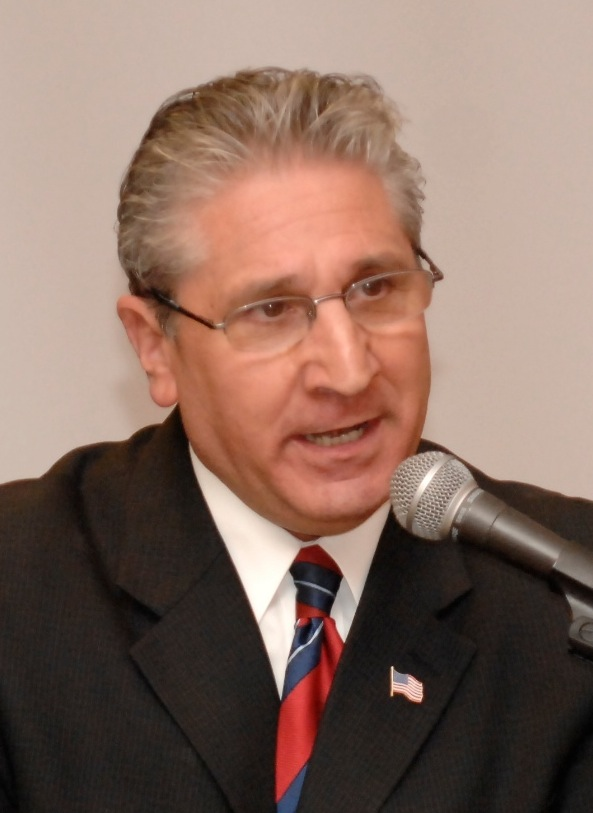
Jim Tedisco, minority leader of the New York State Assembly 2005–2009

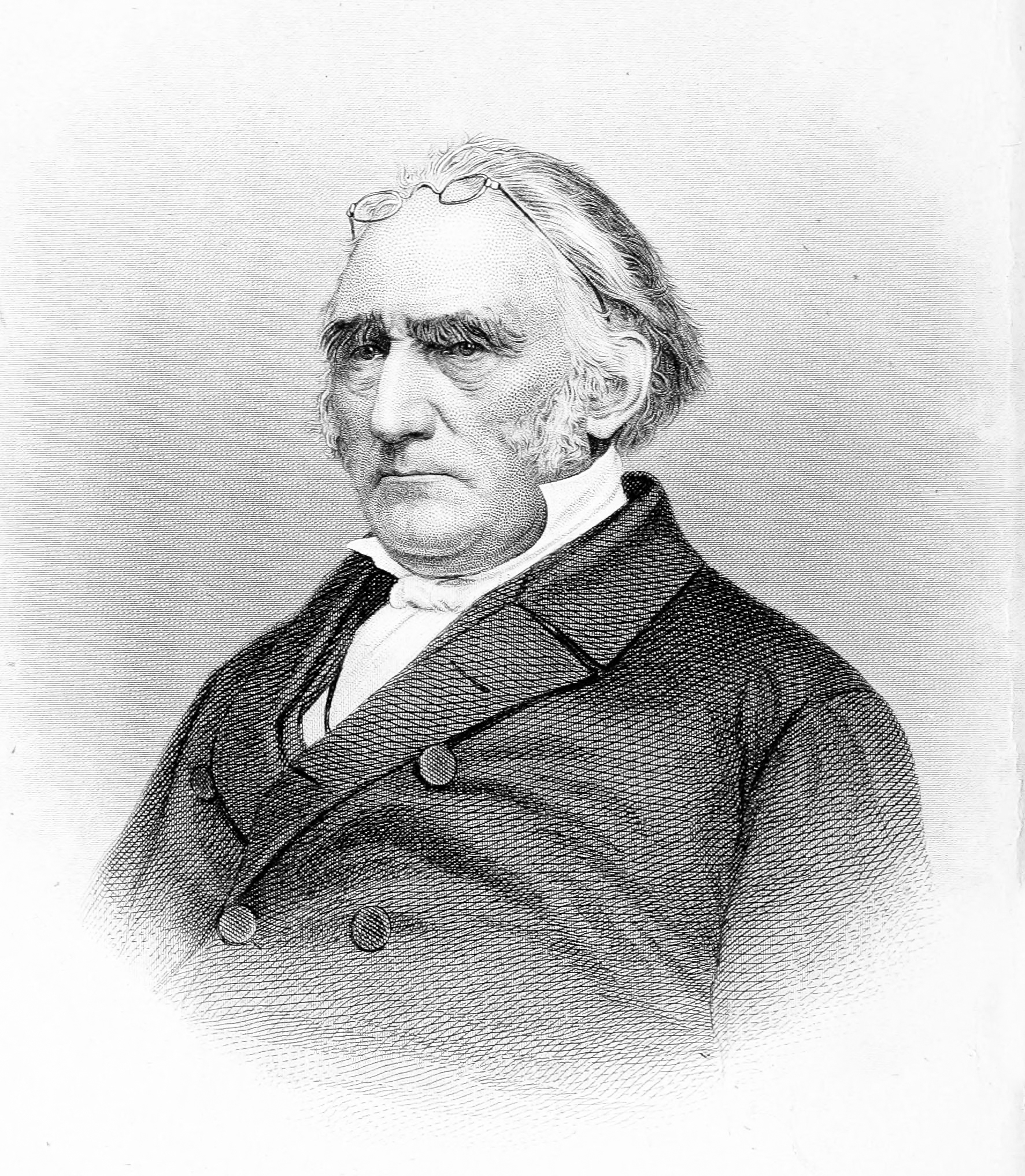
Francis Wayland, president of Brown University, 1827–1855

== Bibliography ==
- ANB: American National Biography. New York: Oxford University Press. 1999. OCLC 39182280.
- Ohles, John (1978). Biographical Dictionary of American Educators. Westport, CT: Greenwood Press. ISBN 0-8371-9893-3. OCLC 3447005.
- BDUSC: Biographical Directory of the United States Congress, 1774-2005. Washington, D.C.: United States Government Printing Office. 2005. ISBN 0-16-073176-3. OCLC 63049058.
- DAB: Dictionary of American Biography. New York: Scribner. 1928. OCLC 4171403.
- Hall, Leander (1906). Union College" Half-Century of the Class of 1856. OCLC 6879274.
- Kiddle, Henry (2003) [1st pub. 1877]. Cyclopaedia of Education. New York: E. Steiger. ISBN 1-84371-061-7. OCLC 177356.
- Lanham, Charles (1876). Biographical Annals of the Civil Government of the United States. Washington, D.C.: James Anglim. OCLC 420698.
- NCAB: National Cyclopaedia of American Biography. Clifton, N.J.: J.T. White. 1972 [1st pub. 1892]. ISBN 0-403-01271-6. OCLC 1759175.
- UCAD: Union College Alumni Directory, 2005. Chesapeake, VA: Harris Publishing Company. 2005. OCLC 69188245.
- UUCC: Union University Centennial Catalog: 1795-1895. Troy, New York: Troy Times. 1895. OCLC 15602752. "union college centennial catalog."(Full text via Google Books.)
- Raymond, Andrew Van Vranken (1993) [1st pub. 1907]. Union University. New York: Lewis Publishing Company. ISBN 0-9519312-2-9. OCLC 11901093.(Full text via Google Books.)
