= Pistorio =

Pistorio may refer to:

- Giovanni Pistorio (born 1960), Italian politician
- Pasquale Pistorio (1936–2025), Italian businessman
- Pierre-François Pistorio (born 1957), French actor and singer
