= Lightwave =

Lightwave may refer to:

== Arts, Entertainment, and Media ==
=== Groups and labels ===
- Lightwave (band), ambient music band by Christoph Harbonnier and Christian Wittman

=== Songs ===
- Bridged by a Lightwave, a 2020 song by Deadmau5 and Kiesza

=== Print ===
- Journal of Lightwave Technology, a biweekly science journal published by the Optical Society and the IEEE Photonics Society

== Businesses ==
- Electric Lightwave, a subsidiary of Zayo Group Holdings
- Lightwave Electronics Corporation, a developer and manufacturer of diode-pumped solid-state lasers

== Technology ==
- Lightwave 3D, computer graphics program developed by NewTek
