= Bich-Yen Nguyen =

Vietnamese electronics engineer

Bich-Yen Nguyen is a Vietnamese electronics engineer specializing in advanced materials and technologies for integrated circuits. Educated in the US, she works in France as a senior fellow for Soitec, working on silicon on insulator technology.

== Education and career ==
Nguyen is the daughter of a South Vietnamese commander who died when she was young, leaving her family poor. Despite this hardship, her mother continued to send her to a boarding school, and then to the University of Texas at Austin in the US for her university education. While she was there, the Fall of Saigon in 1975 left the rest of her family as refugees, and she helped them resettle in the US. She graduated in 1977, with a bachelor's degree in chemical engineering.

After working briefly for the city of Austin, Texas, she began working for Motorola in 1980. Her work there included the development of the multiple-independent-gate field-effect transistor (MIGFET), as well as CMOS technology. As head of advanced transistor development activities at 2004 Motorola spinoff Freescale Semiconductor, she participated in the Crolles Alliance, an international collaboration on CMOS that extended from 2002 to 2007. She was hired by Soitec as a substrate design engineer in 2007.

== Recognition ==
Before leaving Motorola, Nguyen was a Motorola Distinguished Innovator and Dan Noble Fellow. She was one of the winners of the 2004 Women of Color Technology Awards. Her work as a vice president of Soitec was highlighted in the 2010 video production Paris by Night 99, honoring successful Vietnamese expatriates worldwide.

She was named an IEEE Fellow, in the 2020 class of fellows, "for contributions to silicon on insulator technology".

She received the 2024 IEEE Frederik Philips Award, "for leadership in the research, development, and commercialization of innovative silicon-on-insulator substrates, process technologies, and devices".
