= Antun Domic =

Antun Domic is a Chilean-American engineer and mathematician.

== Early life and education ==
Domic obtained his Ph.D. in Mathematics from the Massachusetts Institute of Technology in 1978, with a dissertation in partial differential equations.

== Career ==
In 1982, Domic became a member of the technical staff of MIT Lincoln Laboratory in Lexington, MA. While there, Domic and his colleagues developed the Lincoln Boolean Synthesizer.

In 1985, Domic joined Digital Equipment Corporation where one of the EDA tools developed by Domic and his colleagues was CLEO, an automatic layout generator (from schematic) which was used to design blocks of several RISC processors at DEC.

Domic joined Synopsys in 1997 as vice-president of engineering for the Design Tools Group. At the end of 2016, Domic was appointed Synopsys CTO.

=== Mathematics ===
In 1987, Domic and Domingo Toledo wrote the paper "The Gromov norm of the Kähler class of symmetric domains" (Mathematische Annalen. 276 no. 3, 425–43).

== Awards ==
Domic is an IEEE Fellow, and the recipient of the 2019 IEEE Robert N. Noyce Medal.
