= Tsai Ming-kai =

Taiwanese billionaire

- 蔡明介
- Born: 6 April 1950 (age 76); Taiwan
- Education: National Taiwan University (BS); University of Cincinnati (MS)
- Awards: Morris Chang Exemplary Leadership Award

Tsai Ming-kai (Chinese: 蔡明介; pinyin: Cài Míngjié; Pe̍h-ōe-jī: Chhòa Bêng-kài; born 6 April 1950, in Taiwan) is a Taiwanese entrepreneur who is the chairman of MediaTek.

In 2014, according to Forbes he was ranked 20th Taiwanese by net worth ($1.80 billion). In 2014 he was 21st in the "Best-Performing CEOs in the World" ranking by Harvard Business Review.

In 2016, he received the Morris Chang Exemplary Leadership Award for pioneering the Taiwan semiconductor design industry. Tsai was awarded the 2024 IEEE Robert N. Noyce Medal.

In 2025, he was listed on the Asian Scientist 100 published by Asian Scientist.
