= Kelin Kuhn =

American electronics engineer

Kelin Jo Kuhn is an American electronics engineer known for her work on process variation and scale reduction, particularly in CMOS electronics. She is an adjunct professor in the Department of Materials Science and Engineering at Cornell University.

== Education and career ==
Kuhn graduated in 1980 from the University of Washington, with a bachelor's degree in electrical engineering. She went to Stanford University for graduate study, earning a master's degree and then completing her Ph.D. in 1985. In her doctoral work and her early academic career, she was a laser engineer; her dissertation, Research and Development of a High Average Power Photo-processing Laser System, was supervised by Robert L. Byer.

She returned to the University of Washington as a faculty member from 1987 until 1997, in the Department of Materials Science and Engineering. In 1997 she moved to Intel, where she became an Intel Fellow before retiring in 2014. While at Intel, her work involved in reducing the minimum dimension of CMOS circuits from 130 nm to 7 nm. On retiring, she joined Cornell as Mary Shepard B. Upson Visiting Professor from 2014 to 2015, and continues at Cornell as an adjunct professor.

== Recognition ==
Kuhn was elected as an IEEE Fellow in 2011. She was the 2012 recipient of the IEEE Paul Rappaport Award, and the 2016 recipient of the IEEE Frederik Philips Award, "for technical leadership in the development and implementation of breakthrough CMOS technology".

She was elected to the National Academy of Engineering in 2023, "for technical contributions enabling development and integration of novel transistor devices".
