= IEEE Robert N. Noyce Medal =

Award by the IEEE

- Awarded for: Exceptional contributions to the microelectronics industry
- Presented by: Institute of Electrical and Electronics Engineers
- First award: 1999
- Website: IEEE Robert N. Noyce Medal

The IEEE Robert N. Noyce Medal is a science award presented by the IEEE for outstanding contributions to the microelectronics industry. It is given to individuals who have demonstrated contributions in multiple areas including technology development, business development, industry leadership, development of technology policy, and standards development. The medal is named in honour of Robert N. Noyce, the co-founder of Intel Corporation. He was also renowned for his 1959 invention of the integrated circuit. The medal is funded by Intel Corporation and was first awarded in 2000.

== Recipients ==
- 2000: Morris Chang (Taiwan Semiconductor Manufacturing, Taiwan) For his vision and leadership in pioneering the silicon integrated circuit foundry industry.
- 2001: Hajime Sasaki (NEC Corporation, Japan) For contributions to, and leadership in, the technology and business development of semiconductor devices and the harmonization of the global semiconductor industry.
- 2002: Yoshio Nishi (Texas Instruments Inc., United States) For strategic leadership in global semiconductor research and development.
- 2003: Donald R. Scrifres (JDS Uniphase, United States) For pioneering contributions to the technology and business development of semiconductor lasers.
- 2004: Craig R. Barrett (Intel Corporation, United States) For contributions to semiconductor manufacturing technology, and leadership in business and in industry initiatives.
- 2005: Wilfred J. Corrigan (LSI Logic, United States) For pioneering the modern day gate-array, standard-cell ASIC, system-on-chip and platform ASIC markets and for leadership in semiconductor business, technology, and industry cooperation.
- 2006: Shoichiro Yoshida (Nikon Corporation, United States) For contributions to, and leadership in, the technology and business development of IC lithography.
- 2007: Aart de Geus (Synopsys Inc., United States) For contributions to, and leadership in, the technology and business development of the Electronic Design Automation.
- 2008: Paul R. Gray (University of California, Berkeley, United States) For pioneering the development of analog integrated circuits.
- 2009: Eliyahou Harari (Sandisk Corporation, United States) For leadership in development and commercialization of flash electrically erasable programmable read-only memory (Flash EEPROM)-based Data Storage products.
- 2010: James C Morgan (Applied Materials, United States) For vision and leadership that transformed Applied Materials into an innovation leader and global partner for advancing microelectronics manufacturing technology.
- 2011: Pasquale Pistorio (STMicroelectronics, Europe) For contributions to, and leadership in, the technology, business and environmental development of the global semiconductor and electronics industry.
- 2012: Yoon-Woo Lee (Samsung Electronics, Korea) For vision and leadership establishing Korea as a global leader in producing semiconductor memory chips and liquid-crystal-display (LCD) technologies and helping build Samsung Electronics into the world’s largest electronics company.
- 2013: Sunlin Chou and Youssef A El-Mansy (Intel, USA) For contributions to propelling Intel Corporation to its position as an industry-leading manufacturer of logic devices and accelerating advancements in computing.
- 2014: John E. Kelly III (IBM, USA) For global executive leadership in semiconductor technology R&D.
- 2015: Martin Van Den Brink (ASML, The Netherlands) For exceptional contributions to the microelectronics industry,.
- 2016: Takuo Sugano (University of Tokyo, Japan) "for contributions to and leadership in the research and development of the science and technology of semiconductor devices."
- 2017: Henry I. Smith Professor Emeritus, Massachusetts Institute of Technology, Cambridge, Massachusetts, USA “For contributions to lithography and nanopatterning through experimental advances in short-wavelength exposure systems and attenuated phase-shift masks.”
- 2018: Tsugio Makimoto, President Technovision Japan.
- 2019: Antun Domic (Synopsys Inc., United States) "for leadership in the research and development of advanced microelectronic design automation tools."
- 2020: Susumu Kohyama (K Associates, Tokyo, Japan) "For global executive leadership in CMOS technology development, and for standardization of design methodology and its impact on the semiconductor industry.”
- 2021: Lisa Su (Advanced Micro Devices, United States) "For leadership in ground-breaking semiconductor products and successful business strategies that contributed to the strength of the microelectronics industry". Su was the first female recipient.
- 2022: Jingsheng Jason Cong (UCLA, United States) "For fundamental contributions to electronic design automation and FPGA design methods".
- 2023: Luc Van den hove (imec, Belgium) "For leadership in creating a worldwide research ecosystem in nanoelectronics technology with applications ranging from high-performance computing to health".
- 2024: Tsai Ming-kai
- 2025: Kinam Kim
- 2026: Chris Malachowsky (Nvidia)
