= John E. Kelly III =

American IBM executive (born 1954)

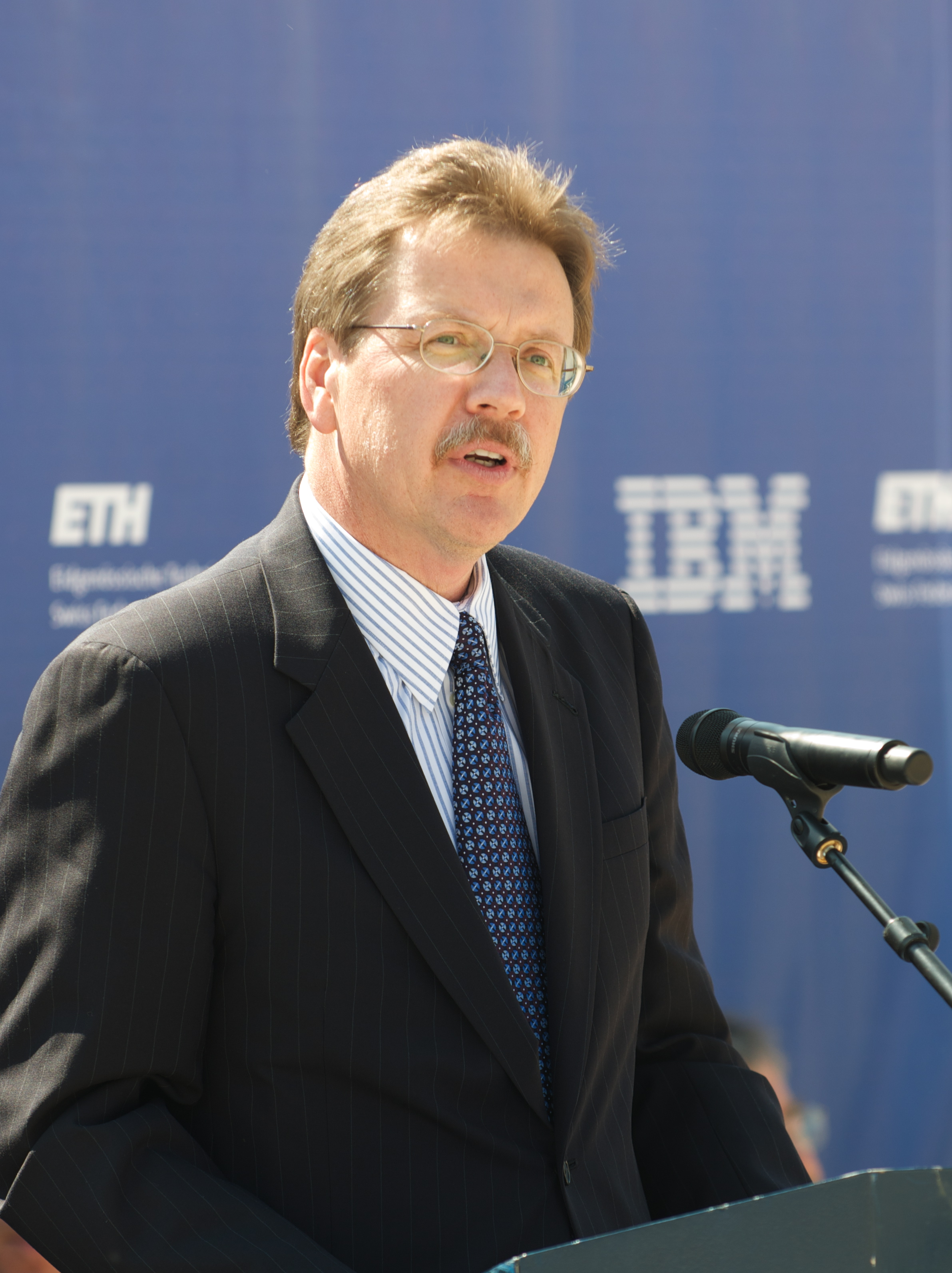
- Kelly in 2009
- Born: 1954 (age 71–72)
- Education: Union College; Rensselaer Polytechnic Institute
- Employer: IBM
- Board member of: New York Academy of Sciences; Rensselaer Polytechnic Institute; Semiconductor Industry Association; Union College
- Awards: IEEE Frederik Philips Award; IEEE Robert N. Noyce Medal

John E. Kelly III is an American executive at IBM. He has been described as the "father" of Watson, a computer system most known for competing against humans on Jeopardy! He joined IBM in 1980 and has served as the director of IBM Research.

Kelly has received the Frederik Philips Award and the Robert N. Noyce Medal, both of which are presented by the Institute of Electrical and Electronics Engineers (IEEE). He has served as a board member for his alma maters, Union College and Rensselaer Polytechnic Institute, as well as the New York Academy of Sciences and the Semiconductor Industry Association.

Kelly was elected a member of the National Academy of Engineering in 2013 for contributions to the U.S. semiconductor industry through technology innovations and strategic leadership.

== Early life and education ==
Kelly was raised in Albany, New York, and attended Bishop Maginn High School. He earned his bachelor's degree in physics from Union College in 1976. Kelly received his master's degree in physics and doctorate in materials engineering from the Rensselaer Polytechnic Institute in 1978 and 1980, respectively.

== Career ==
Kelly has held various roles at IBM since 1980. He was named director of the company's Semiconductor Research and Development Center in 1990, then became IBM Research's vice president of systems, technology and science in 1995. Kelly served as general manager of IBM Microelectronics from 1999 to August 2000. In 2007, he succeeded Paul Horn as the head of IBM Research. He has also served as a senior vice president of cognitive solutions and director of IBM Research, and an executive vice president. He serves as chairman of the IBM Academy of Technology's board of governors.

In 2020, Kelly represented IBM at a conference on the ethics of artificial intelligence (AI) organized by the Pontifical Academy for Life, where he signed the "Rome Call for AI Ethics", which advocated for the responsible use of AI technologies. He also announced IBM's partnership with the Bambino Gesù Hospital in Vatican City to use Watson to gather data about brain cancer and other diseases. In late February, Kelly was tasked with building and directing IBM's COVID-19 Task Force.

On the 18th of December, 2020, IBM announced that Kelly will retire from the company at the end of the year.

=== Semiconductors ===
In 1997, during Kelly's tenure as vice president of IBM's chip division, the company developed a method of manufacturing computer chips with copper instead of aluminum.

Kelly is a board member and former chairman of the Semiconductor Industry Association. He received the IEEE Robert N. Noyce Medal for outstanding contributions to the microelectronics industry, as well as the IEEE Frederik Philips Award for accomplishments in the management of research and development. In 2013, he received the National Academy of Engineering's Arthur M. Bueche Award for his work on semiconductor technology.

=== Intellectual property ===
In his role as senior vice president of technology and intellectual property (IP), Kelly led IBM's technical and innovation strategies, as well as the company's IP initiatives. He continued focusing on IP during his tenure at IBM Research.

=== Supercomputing and Watson ===
Kelly has worked on IBM's Summit and Sierra supercomputers, and has overseen the company's artificial intelligence and research projects. He has been credited for leading a team to advance the Watson computer system. InformationWeek described Kelly as the "father of Watson" and credited him for encouraging the system to compete against humans on Jeopardy! He co-wrote Smart Machines: IBM's Watson and the Era of Cognitive Computing.

== Personal life and philanthropy ==
Kelly is married and a Catholic. He and his wife provided funding for Union College's digital arts lab, which is part of the institution's computer science and visual arts departments. The John E. Kelly III '76 Digital Arts Lab was dedicated in 2006. Kelly also helped fund the Peter Irving Wold Center, which opened in 2011 with the Kelly Advanced Computing Laboratory named in his honor. He also helped Union College acquire an IBM Intelligent Cluster, giving the school "one of the most advanced computing capabilities of any undergraduate liberal arts college in the nation".

Kelly has served on the boards of trustees for each of his alma maters, Union College and the Rensselaer Polytechnic Institute. He has served on Union College's board since 2003, and was elected chairman in 2015. Kelly received an honorary Doctor of Science degree from Union Graduate College in 2004, and an honorary degree from Dublin City University in 2012. He has also received a Lifetime Achievement Award from Rensselaer Polytechnic Institute. Kelly is a fellow of the IEEE, serves on the New York Academy of Sciences' board of governors, and is a member of the National Academy of Engineering.

== Publications ==
- Kelly III, John; Hamm, Steve. Smart Machines: IBM's Watson and the Era of Cognitive Computing.
- Kelly III, John E. (March 21, 2016). "IBM's Top Researcher: A Win for Computers Is a Win for Humans". Time.

== See also ==
- List of Dublin City University people
- List of Rensselaer Polytechnic Institute people
- List of Union College alumni
