= IEEE Frederik Philips Award =

- Awarded for: Outstanding accomplishments in the management of research and development resulting in effective innovation in the electrical and electronics industry
- Presented by: Institute of Electrical and Electronics Engineers
- First award: 1971
- Website: IEEE Frederik Philips Award

The IEEE Frederik Philips Award is a Technical Field Award that was established by the IEEE in 1971. The award is presented for outstanding accomplishments in the management of research and development resulting in effective innovation in the electrical and electronics industry. This award may be presented to an individual or team of up to three people. Recipients of this award receive a bronze medal, certificate, and honorarium.

== Recipients ==
- 1971: Frederik J. Philips
- 1972: William O. Baker
- 1973: John H. Dessauer
- 1974: Chauncey Guy Suits
- 1975: C. Lester Hogan
- 1976: Koji Kobayashi
- 1977: No Award
- 1978: William E. Shoupp
- 1979: Gordon Moore
- 1980: William M. Webster
- 1981: Dean A. Watkins
- 1982: Werner J. Kleen
- 1983: Allen E. Puckett
- 1984: John K. Galt
- 1985: George Heilmeier
- 1986: William Hittinger
- 1987: Solomon J. Buchsbaum
- 1988: George F. Smith
- 1989: Klaus D. Bowers
- 1990: Rajinder J. Khosla
- 1991: Gene Strull
- 1992: Alan Gerald Chynoweth
- 1993: Max Tibor Weiss
- 1994: Minoru Nagata
- 1995: James C. McGroddy
- 1996: Michiyuki Uenohara
- 1997: Roland P. O. Hüber
- 1998: Larry W. Sumney
- 1998: Robert M. Burger
- 1998: William C. Holton
- 1999: Roger J. Van Overstraeten
- 2000: Gerald M. Borsuk
- 2001: Arun N. Netravali
- 2002: Toshiharu Aoki
- 2003: Thomas Rowbotham
- 2004: Youssef El-Mansy
- 2005: Hiroyoshi Komiya
- 2006: Louis C. Parrillo
- 2007: Yong-Kyung (Kenneth) Lee
- 2008: Gilbert J. Declerck
- 2009: Shojiro Asai
- 2010: John E. Kelly III
- 2011: Dim-Lee Kwong
- 2012: Chih-Yuan (C. Y.) Lu
- 2013: William M. Holt
- 2014: Henry T. Nicholas, III
- 2015: Benedetto Vigna
- 2016: Kelin J. Kuhn
- 2017: Gary L. Patton
- 2018: Ian A. Young
- 2019: Asad M. Madni
- 2020: Kazuo Yano
- 2021: (no award)
- 2022: Yuh-Jier Mii and Cliff Hou
- 2023: Omkaram Nalamasu
- 2024: Bich-Yen Nguyen
- 2025: Dierdre Hanford
- 2026: Julie Brown
- 2027: Ann B. Kelleher
