= Paris by Night 99 =

Paris By Night 99
- Paris by Night episode
- Bìa DVD PBN 99
- Episode no.: Episode 99
- Directed by: Alan Carter
- Masters of ceremonies: Nguyễn Ngọc Ngạn; Nguyễn Cao Kỳ Duyên; Trịnh Hội
- Filmed at: Buena Park, California
- Filmed on: January 16 and 17, 2010
- Venue: Charles M. Schulz Theater, Knott's Berry Farm
- Executive producers: Marie Tô; Paul Huỳnh
- Format: 2 Disc DVD
- Release date: April 9, 2010

Paris By Night 99 – Tôi Là Người Việt Nam (I Am Vietnamese) is a Paris By Night program produced by Thúy Nga Productions that was filmed at Knott's Berry Farm on 16 and 17 January 2010 and released DVD from 9 April 2010. The show was hosted by Nguyễn Ngọc Ngạn, Nguyễn Cao Kỳ Duyên and Trịnh Hội.

This is a musical variety show to introduce and honour the successful Vietnamese people living in many places around the world. All the songs in the show have been composed after 1975 except for the first one (Tình ca).

== Performances ==
=== Disc 1 ===
1. Video clip: Tôi Là Người Việt Nam / I am Vietnamese
2. Tình Ca (Phạm Duy) – Như Quỳnh, Mai Thiên Vân, Ngọc Anh, Nguyệt Anh, Thế Sơn, Trần Thái Hòa, Quang Lê, Trịnh Lam, Hương Giang, Hương Thủy, Quỳnh Vi, Hồ Lệ Thu
3. Dân Biểu Quốc hội Liên Bang Hoa Kỳ: Luật sư Cao Quang Ánh
4. Lời Ngỏ – Nguyễn Ngọc Ngạn & Nguyễn Cao Kỳ Duyên
5. Nhạt Nhòa (Tuấn Khanh) – Ý Lan
6. Quê Mẹ (Thu Hồ) – Mai Thiên Vân
7. Video clip: Chinh Chu – Senior Managing Director, The Blackstone Group
8. Phỏng vấn Chính dien vien hong Chu
9. Liên Khúc: Mời Anh Về Thăm Quê Em (Thùy Linh) & Sóc Sờ Bai Sóc Trăng (Thanh Sơn) – Hà Phương & Hương Thủy
10. Video clip: Nguyễn Thị Bích Yến – Vice President Soitec
11. Phỏng vấn Nguyễn Thị Bích Yến
12. Liên Khúc: Tình Đã Vụt Bay (Vũ Tuấn Đức) & Nhớ (Trịnh Nam Sơn) – Kỳ Phương Uyên & Lưu Bích
13. Ở Đâu Cũng Có Em (Trần Quảng Nam) – Trần Thái Hòa
14. Video clip: Vu Sư Mixed Martial Arts / Mixed martial artist Lê Cung
15. Phỏng vấn Lê Cung
16. Liên Khúc Đức Huy (Để Quên Con Tim & Và Tôi Cũng Yêu Em) – Lương Tùng Quang & Mai Tiến Dũng
17. Video clip: Biên Đạo Múa Ballet / Ballet-Choreographer Thắng Đào
18. Phỏng vấn Thắng Đào
19. Ướt Mi (Trịnh Công Sơn) – Khánh Ly
20. Liên Khúc: Dấu Chân Tình Ái (Ngọc Trọng) & Tóc Ngang Bờ Vai (Vũ Tuấn Đức) – Như Loan & Nguyễn Thắng
21. Video clip: Công Ty BTL Machine
22. Phỏng vấn Võ Bửu – CEO Công Ty BTL Machine
23. Tình Cha (Ngọc Sơn) – Thành An
24. Đổi Cả Thiên Thu Tiếng Mẹ Cười (Nhạc: Võ Tá Hân, thơ: Trần Trung Đạo) – Thế Sơn
25. Video clip: Phi Hành Gia NASA / Scientists, astronauts NASA Dr. Eugene Trịnh Hữu Châu
26. Tình Đẹp Hậu Giang (Trần Thiện Thanh) – Phi Nhung & Duy Trường
27. Kỷ Niệm (Phạm Duy) – Dương Triệu Vũ
28. Phỏng vấn Duy-Loan Le – Founder & Advisor, Sunflower Mission
29. Video clip: Hội Văn Hóa Khoa Học Kỹ Thuật/Phỏng Vấn Ông Nguyễn Ngọc Bảo – Founder & Advisor VCSA
30. Video clip: Ph.D. Professor of Astronomy Trịnh Xuân Thuận
31. Video clip: Canada/Phỏng vấn Đức Giám Mục Vincent Nguyễn Mạnh Hiếu

=== Disc 2 ===
1. Giới thiệu sách "Kỷ Niệm Sân Khấu"
2. Hài Kịch: Thiên Đàng Không Phải Là Đây (Nguyễn Ngọc Ngạn) – Thúy Nga, Chí Tài, Bé Tí, Hương Thủy
3. Video Clip: Cuisine
4. Phỏng vấn Lê Chí Huy – Nhà Hàng Indochine
5. Câu Kinh Tình Yêu (Sỹ Đan) – Don Hồ
6. Video Clip: Lawyer Viet Dinh – Assistant Attorney General of the United States (2001–03), Professor of Law, Georgetown University
7. Phỏng vấn Viet Dinh
8. Tim Em Mãi Thuộc Về Anh (Đồng Sơn) – Minh Tuyết
9. Video Clip: Úc Châu
10. Tháng 6 Trời Mưa (Nhạc: Hoàng Thanh Tâm, thơ: Nguyên Sa) – Ngọc Anh
11. Tôi Muốn Nói Yêu Em (Mai Anh Việt) – Nguyễn Hưng
12. Video Clip: Mike Nguyễn – Animator/Producer
13. Duyên Phận (Thái Thịnh) – Như Quỳnh
14. Quê Hương Tuổi Thơ Tôi (Từ Huy) – Ngọc Hạ
15. Video Clip: Fashion Designers
16. Phỏng vấn: Calvin Trần, Thiện Lê, Kim Phan
17. Liên Khúc Quốc Hùng (Cơn Mưa Chiều Nay, Lung Linh Giọt Mưa, Vu Vơ Tình Đầu) – Tú Quyên, Quỳnh Vi, Lam Anh
18. Người Em Vỹ Dạ (Minh Kỳ, Tôn Nữ Thụy Khương) – Quang Lê
19. Video Clip: Quý Tôn – CEO Regal Nails
20. Phỏng vấn Quý Tôn
21. Xin Đừng Quay Lại (Diệu Hương) – Bằng Kiều
22. Liên Khúc: Cứ Lừa Dối Đi (Huỳnh Nhật Tân) & Biển Chiều (Trịnh Lam) – Hồ Lệ Thu & Trịnh Lam
23. Video Clip: Daniel Phú Dinh – Eyelash extension expert
24. Phỏng vấn Daniel Phú Đinh
25. Em Trong Mắt Tôi (Nguyễn Đức Cường) – Tóc Tiên
26. Quê Hương Mình (Hoài An) – Nguyệt Anh & Hương Giang
27. Finale

== Sources ==
- Paris By Night 99 DVDs.
- Thúy Nga Paris và ‘Tôi là người Việt Nam’, Báo Người Việt, 19/1/2010
- Đi xem PBN 99 “Tôi Là Người Việt Nam”

Preceded by Paris By Night 98: Fly with us to Las Vegas	Paris By Night; Paris By Night 99: Tôi là người Việt Nam	Succeeded by Paris By Night Divas : Đêm hội ngộ của các nữ siêu sao
