= Ann Kelleher =

Irish engineer

- Education: University College Cork; National Microelectronics Research Centre

Ann B. Kelleher is an Irish retired engineer. She is the first woman to have received a Doctor of Philosophy from the National Microelectronics Research Centre, now part of the Tyndall National Institute at University College Cork. She is a former senior vice president for Intel, where she reported directly to the company's chief executive officer and led the company's technology development team, focusing on developing 5 nm and 7 nm process technology.

She was the first Irish woman to be named a vice-president of Intel. Following her retirement, the Institute of Electrical and Electronics Engineers recognised Kelleher with the 2027 Frederik Philips Award for management of innovative industry research and development in electronics.

== Early life and education ==
Kelleher is originally from Macroom in County Cork, Ireland, where her father worked as a farmer. With parental encouragement, Kelleher pursued maths and science in secondary school, and chose to study engineering in University College Cork (UCC), being one of just five women in a class of 55. She specialized in electrical engineering and graduated in 1987. Kelleher continued electrical engineering studies at Masters level instead of accepting a job offer at Digital in Clonmel in County Tipperary, graduating in 1989. She then became the first woman to receive a Doctor of Philosophy from Ireland's National Microelectronics Research Centre (NMRC), now part of the Tyndall National Institute at UCC, in 1993.

== Early career ==
In 1996 Kelleher joined Intel Ireland in Leixlip in County Kildare, as a process engineer. Her first major role of responsibility was as factory manager of Fab 24, a plant for the manufacturing of semiconductors, in Leixlip, when it opened in 2006. At the time, it was Intel's first chip factory in Europe using advanced 65 nm process technology. In 2008, Kelleher decided to go to the United States to become the plant manager at Intel's Fab 12 plant in Chandler, Arizona. Kelleher also site managed Intel's Rio Rancho, New Mexico, Fab 11X fabrication facility for a period before finally moving to Portland, Oregon, in 2015.

== Later career ==
Kelleher was general manager of the Fab/Sort Manufacturing organization. In that role, she was responsible for all aspects of Intel's high-volume silicon manufacturing. In 2011, Kelleher became the first Irish woman in the history of the company to be named as a vice president. In January 2018, she was promoted to senior vice-president of the Technology and Manufacturing Group, a unit of around 30,000 staff. Her role included corporate quality assurance, customer fulfillment and supply-chain management, and strategic planning for the company's worldwide manufacturing operations.

In 2018 Kelleher was one of 25 women recognised in the "Ireland's Most Powerful Women Awards". Later that year, Forbes suggested that Kelleher would be well suited to replacing Elon Musk as the Chairman of Tesla, Inc. due to her experience in "high-tech and high-volume manufacturing".

On 27 July 2020, Intel separated the Technology, Systems Architecture and Client Group (TSCG) into several teams, whose leaders reported directly to the CEO. Kelleher was named as the head of the Technology Development Team. Intel called her "An accomplished Intel leader," saying "Kelleher has been head of Intel manufacturing, where she ensured continuous operations through the COVID-19 pandemic while increasing supply capacity to meet customer needs and accelerating the ramp of Intel's 10nm process."

However, Intel's business faltered. Intel conducted several waves of significant layoffs in 2024 through 2026, and Kelleher retired from the company.

After her retirement from Intel, Kelleher was named the recipient of the 2027 IEEE Frederik Philips Award, "for leading the historic advancement of CMOS process technology, culminating in the first node with backside power delivery".

== Advocacy for gender equality in engineering ==
Kelleher is an advocate for women working in engineering roles and holding senior management positions in the tech industry. She has said that more girls should study science, technology, engineering, and mathematics (STEM) subjects in school and university. Kelleher has also argued that more women should be applying for senior management roles.

== Personal life ==
In 2018, she was reported to have two cats with European passports that were "ready to travel at all times". Kelleher traveled for work, often going to Asia once or twice a year and Europe three times a year, not counting trips to Ireland.
