= Jason Cong =

American computer scientist

- Born: 1963 (age 62–63); Beijing
- Citizenship: United States
- Education: Peking University(B.S. degree in computer science), University of Illinois at Urbana-Champaign(PhD)
- Occupations: computer scientist, researcher, educator, and serial entrepreneur
- Awards: 2022 IEEE Robert N. Noyce Medal, 2024 Phil Kaufman Award

Jingsheng Jason Cong (Chinese: 丛京生; born 1963 in Beijing) is a Chinese-born American computer scientist, educator, and serial entrepreneur.

== Education and career ==
He received his B.S. degree in computer science from Peking University in 1985, his M.S. and Ph.D. degrees in computer science from the University of Illinois at Urbana-Champaign in 1987 and 1990, respectively. He has been on the faculty in the Computer Science Department at the University of California, Los Angeles (UCLA) since 1990. Currently, he is a Distinguished Professor, the Volgenau Chair for Engineering Excellence, and the directors of Center for Domain-Specific Computing (CDSC), VLSI Architecture, Synthesis, and Technology (VAST) Laboratory.

== Research and impact ==
Cong made fundamental contributions to the FPGA synthesis technology. His result in the early 1990s on depth-optimal mapping (FlowMap) for lookup-table based FPGAs is a cornerstone of all FPGA logic synthesis tools used today. This, together with the subsequent works on the cut-enumeration and Boolean matching based methods for FPGA mapping, led to a successful startup company Aplus Design Technologies (1998–2003) founded by Cong. Aplus developed the first commercially available FPGA architecture evaluation tool and physical synthesis tool, which were OEMed by most FPGA companies and distributed to tens of thousands of FPGA designers worldwide. Aplus was acquired by Magma Design Automation in 2003, which is now part of Synopsys.

Cong's research also made significant impact on high-level synthesis (HLS) for integrated circuits. The decade-long research in 2000s by his group led to another UCLA spin-off, AutoESL Design Automation (2006–2011), co-founded by Cong. AutoESL developed most widely used HLS tool for FPGAs and was acquired by Xilinx in 2011. The HLS tool from AutoESL (renamed as Vivado HLS after Xilinx acquisition) allows FPGA designers to use C/C++ software programming languages instead of hardware description languages for FPGA design and implementation.

In 2009, Cong led a group of twelve faculty members from UCLA, Rice, Ohio-State, and UC Santa Barbara and won a highly competitive NSF Expeditions in Computing Award on Customizable Domain-Specific Computing (CDSC).

Cong's research on interconnect-centric design for integrated circuits plays a significant role in overcoming the timing closure challenge in deep submicron designs in 1990s. His work on VLSI interconnect planning, synthesis, and layout optimization as well as highly scalable multi-level analytical circuit placement are embedded in the core of all physical synthesis tools developed by the EDA industry. The best-known industry adoption example was Magma Design Automation, which was founded in 1997 aiming at achieving timing closure through physical synthesis. Cong served on its Technical Advisory Board since its inception until its IPO, and later as its Chief Technology Advisor from 2003 to 2008. Magma was acquired by Synopsys in 2012.

== Selected awards ==
2022 IEEE Robert N. Noyce Medal for "fundamental contributions to electronic design automation and FPGA design methods".

2024 Phil Kaufman Award for fundamental contributions to FPGA design automation technology.

2024 ACM Chuck Thacker Breakthrough Award for "fundamental contributions to the design and automation of field-programmable systems and customizable computing".

Cong's work on FlowMap received the 2011 ACM/IEEE A. Richard Newton Technical Impact Award in Electronic Design Automation "for pioneering work on technology mapping for FPGA that has made significant impact to the FPGA research community and industry", and was the first inducted to the FPGA and Reconfigurable Computing Hall of Fame by ACM TCFPGA.

Cong was elected to IEEE Fellow in 2000 "for seminal contributions in computer-aided design of integrated circuits, especially in physical design automation, interconnect optimization, and synthesis of FPGAs", and ACM Fellow in 2008 "for contributions to electronic design automation".

He received the 2010 IEEE Circuits and System (CAS) Society Technical Achievement Award "For seminal contributions to electronic design automation, especially in FPGA synthesis, VLSI interconnect optimization, and physical design automation", and also the 2016 IEEE Computer Society Technical Achievement Award "For setting the algorithmic foundations for high-level synthesis of field programmable gate arrays". He is the first one who received a Technical Achievement Award from both the IEEE Circuits and Systems Society and the Computer Society.

In February 2017, Cong was elected as a member in National Academy of Engineering. He was elected a foreign member of the Chinese Academy of Engineering in 2019.

In 2020, he was elected to be a fellow of the National Academy of Inventors, and in 2024, he was elected to be a member of the American Academy of Arts and Sciences.

In 2026, Cong received the Harold Pender Award, the highest honor bestowed by the University of Pennsylvania School of Engineering and Applied Science, and delivered the accompanying lecture in Philadelphia.
