= Henry I. Smith =

American inventor and physicist

Henry Ignatius Smith
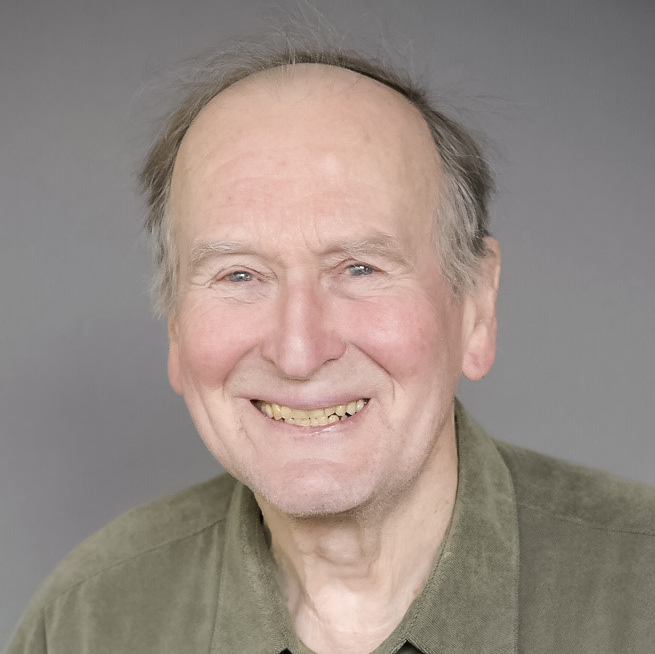
- Born: May 26, 1937 (age 88); Jersey City, New Jersey, U.S.
- Education: B.Sc. in Physics, College of the Holy Cross, 1958; M.Sc. in Physics, Boston College, 1960; Ph.D. in Physics, Boston College, 1966
- Known for: Nanofabrication techniques; Attenuated phase-shift mask; Liquid-immersion lithography; X-ray lithography advancements
- Awards: IEEE Robert N. Noyce Medal, 2017
- Scientific career
- Fields: Physics, nanotechnology
- Institutions: Air Force Cambridge Research Laboratories; Boston College; Massachusetts Institute of Technology

Henry I. Smith (born May 26, 1937) is an American inventor and physicist. Smith co-founded two MIT spin-offs, LumArray, Inc., and Sublimit, LLC, further extending the practical applications of his research.

== Career and research contributions ==
Smith was born in Jersey City, New Jersey and raised in Montclair, New Jersey. He graduated in 1958 from the College of the Holy Cross. Smith began his professional career as a first lieutenant in the Air Force Cambridge Research Laboratories from 1960 to 1963. Following his military service, he joined Boston College as an assistant professor of physics. In 1968, he transitioned to the Massachusetts Institute of Technology.

At MIT, Smith initially worked at Lincoln Laboratory. He later founded the Nanostructures Laboratory in the Research Laboratory of Electronics at MIT, where he served as director from 1977 to 2007.

Smith is credited with numerous inventions, including the attenuated phase-shift mask and liquid-immersion lithography.

== Awards and honors ==
- IEEE Robert N. Noyce Medal in 2017
- Member of the National Academy of Engineering and a Fellow of the American Academy of Arts and Sciences
- Member of the IEEE
