= Robert L. Byer =

American physicist

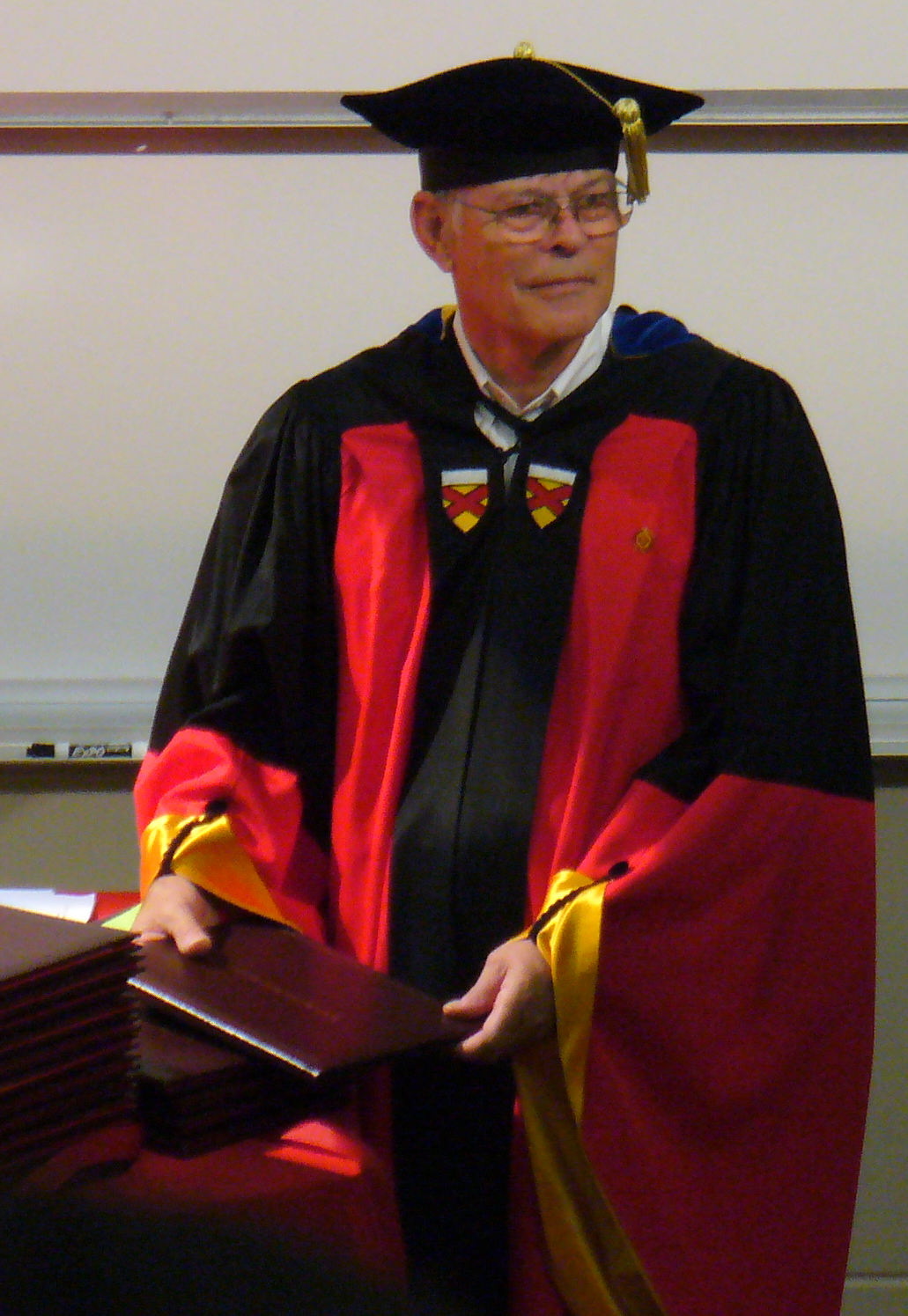
- Robert L. Byer
- Education: Stanford University
- Awards: R. W. Wood Prize (1998); IEEE Photonics Award (2009)
- Scientific career
- Fields: Applied physics
- Workplaces: Stanford University
- Doctoral advisor: Stephen E. Harris
- Doctoral students: Kelin Kuhn

Robert Louis Byer is a physicist. He was president of the Optical Society of America in 1994 and of the American Physical Society in 2012.

He currently is the William R. Kenan, Jr. Professor of Applied Physics at Stanford University. He has conducted research and taught classes in lasers and nonlinear optics at Stanford University since 1969. He has made numerous contributions to laser science and technology including the demonstration of the first tunable visible parametric oscillator, the development of the Q-switched unstable resonator Nd:YAG laser, remote sensing using tunable infrared sources and precision spectroscopy using Coherent Anti Stokes Raman Scattering (CARS). Current research includes the development of nonlinear optical materials and laser diode pumped solid state laser sources for applications to gravitational wave detection and to laser particle acceleration.

He served as chair of the applied physics department from 1980 to 1983 and 1999 to 2002. He served as associate dean of humanities and sciences from 1984 to 1986 and served as vice provost and dean of research at Stanford University from 1987 through 1992. He served as the director of Edward L. Ginzton Laboratory from 2006-2008 after serving as director of Hansen Experimental Physics Laboratory from 1997 through 2006.

Byer played a major role in the success of three laser technology companies. Quanta-Ray commercialized a high-energy pulsed laser invented in the Byer lab which is still widely used in scientific research. Quanta-Ray was acquired by Spectra-Physics in 1981 and is now a part of Newport Corporation. Byer was a founder of Lightwave Electronics, a pioneering designer and manufacturer of diode-pumped solid-state lasers, which was acquired by JDS Uniphase in 2005 and is now a part of Lumentum. He played a similar role at Mobius Photonics, which produced pulsed fiber lasers, and was acquired by IPG Photonics in 2013.

Byer led Stanford University's contributions to the Laser Interferometer Gravitational Wave Observatory, which made the first-ever detection of a disturbance in space-time caused by a pair of merging black holes on September 14, 2015.

Byer is a Fellow of The Optical Society, the Institute of Electrical and Electronics Engineers (IEEE), the American Physical Society and the American Association for the Advancement of Science and the Laser Institute of America. In 1985 Byer served as president of the IEEE Lasers and Electro-optics Society. He was elected president of the Optical Society of America and served in 1994. He is a founding member of the California Council on Science and Technology and served as chair from 1995 - 1999. He was a member of the Air Force Science Advisory Board from 2002–2006 and has been a member of the National Ignition Facility Advisory Committee since 2000.

Byer received the Adolph Lomb Medal in 1972, "for noteworthy contributions to the field of optics at an early career stage." In 1996, Byer received the Quantum Electronics Award from the Lasers and Electro-optics Society of the IEEE. In 1998 he received the R. W. Wood Prize of the Optical Society of America and the A. L. Schawlow Award from the Laser Institute of America. In 2000 he was the recipient of the IEEE Third Millennium Medal. In 2008 he received the IEEE Photonics Award. In 2009, he received the Frederic Ives Medal of the Optical Society of America.

Byer has published more than 500 scientific papers and holds 50 patents in the fields of lasers and nonlinear optics. Professor Byer was elected a member of the National Academy of Engineering in 1987 for major contributions to the science and technology of nonlinear optics. He also became a member of the National Academy of Sciences in 2000.

Byer also received an Optica Honorary Membership in 2023, the most distinguished of all Optica Member categories.
