= Lightwave Electronics Corporation =

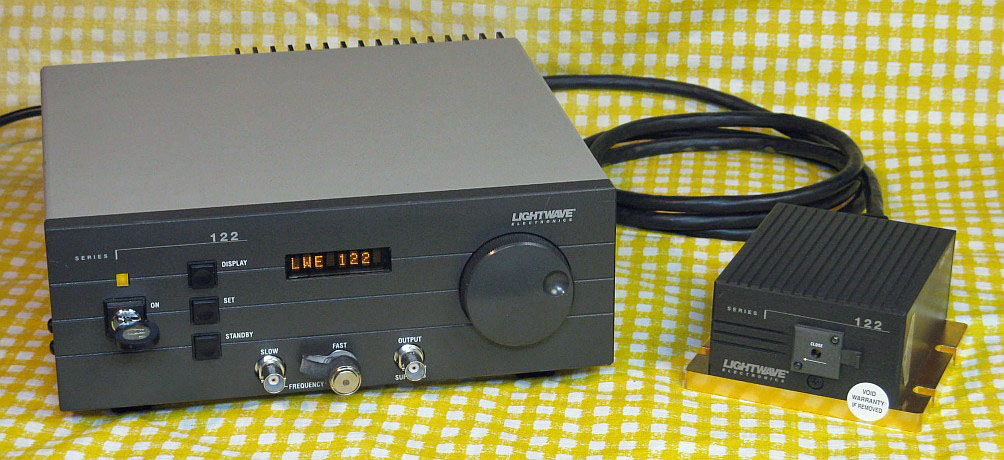
A Lightwave Electronics model 122 microprocessor controlled Nd:YAG laser, produced in about 1990. This laser was based on the nonplanar ring oscillator design. This continuous-wave, single-frequency laser was aimed at the laboratory market. Lightwave Electronic's biggest market was for OEM lasers, (lasers used as components in other manufacturer's systems), primarily Q-switched lasers for micromachining. (Photo from Sam's Laser FAQ, www.repairfaq.org/sam/laserfaq.htm.)

Lightwave Electronics Corporation was a developer and manufacturer of diode-pumped solid-state lasers, and was a significant contributor to the creation and maturation of this technology. Lightwave Electronics was a technology-focused company, with diverse markets, including science and micromachining. Inventors employed by Lightwave Electronics received 51 US patents, and Lightwave Electronics products were referenced by non-affiliated inventors in 91 US patents.

Lightwave Electronics was a California corporation, which was founded in 1984. Some of the founders were Robert L. Mortensen, a former executive at the laser manufacturer Spectra Physics, and Drs. Robert L. Byer and David Bloom, both professors at Stanford University. The Newport Corporation, then headed by Dr. Milton Chang, was a significant early investor. Mortensen was president at the company’s founding, and he served as president for almost 15 years. Phillip Meredith was president from 2000 until the sale of the company in 2005. JDS Uniphase Corporation (JDSU, now Lumentum, stock ticker LITE) purchased Lightwave in 2005, for $65M. At that time, the company had 120 employees. The company was located in Mountain View, California.

== Products ==
In the scientific community, Lightwave Electronics was best known for single-frequency lasers based on the nonplanar ring oscillator design. These lasers operated at the wavelengths of 1064 nm and 1319 nm, and were based on the laser material neodymium-doped yttrium-aluminum garnet (Nd:YAG). The first-generation Laser Interferometer Gravitational Wave Observatory (LIGO) was based on these lasers, operating at 1064 nm. Two Lightwave nonplanar oscillators were launched into space in 2004 as components of NASA’s Tropospheric Emission Spectrometer, an earth-observing satellite instrument which was still operational in 2015. Lightwave Electronics produced a visible (532 nm) laser source based on frequency doubling the output of a nonplanar ring oscillator. The nonlinear material used was magnesium-doped lithium niobate. Another member of the nonplanar ring product family was an “injection seeding” system which was used to enforce single-frequency oscillation in 1-joule-level lamp-pumped Q-switched lasers, improving the utility of those lasers for quantitative spectroscopy. This injection seeding system was the first Lightwave Electronics product with significant sales.

Lightwave Electronics' first significant success in industrial markets was a series of acousto-optically Q-switched lasers at 1047 nm, based on neodymium-doped yttrium lithium fluoride (Nd:YLF), and at 1342 nm, based on neodymium-doped yttrium orthovanadate, which were used to improve yield in semiconductor memory manufacturing. For about 2 decades, from about 1988 to 2008, semiconductor manufacturers used the Lightwave Electronics miniature Q-switched lasers in the link blowing step during the production of the majority of the world’s dynamic random-access memory chips. These miniature Q-switched lasers were in systems built by Electro Scientific Industries, GSI, and Nikon.

Also of significant industrial importance was a series of internally frequency converted Q-switched lasers, with 2 to 20 Watt of ultraviolet output at 355 nm, used for a variety of micromachining applications. Lightwave introduced these UV lasers in 1998. The nonlinear frequency converting material was lithium triborate (LBO). Lightwave’s Q-switched multi-watt UV lasers emitted longer pulses than competing lasers and allowed effective processing of materials, probably by melting as opposed to ablation (vaporization), thus lowering the power needed for removing material in operations such as laser-drilling small holes in circuit boards, or laser-cutting circuit boards

For a few years (circa 1996), Lightwave Electronics produced an acousto-optically mode-locked laser with low frequency jitter and drift. The most significant application was for high-speed measurements of voltages as a step in the design and improvement of integrated circuits. A distinct line of mode-locked lasers produced ultraviolet output at 355 nm, used for fluorescence excitation in flow cytometry applications. Mode-locking was passive, using a semiconductor saturable absorber. In the late 1990s Lightwave Electronics produced a Nd:YAG laser internally frequency doubled to 532 nm with potassium titanyl phosphate (KTP), used in ophthalmology.

== Technology ==
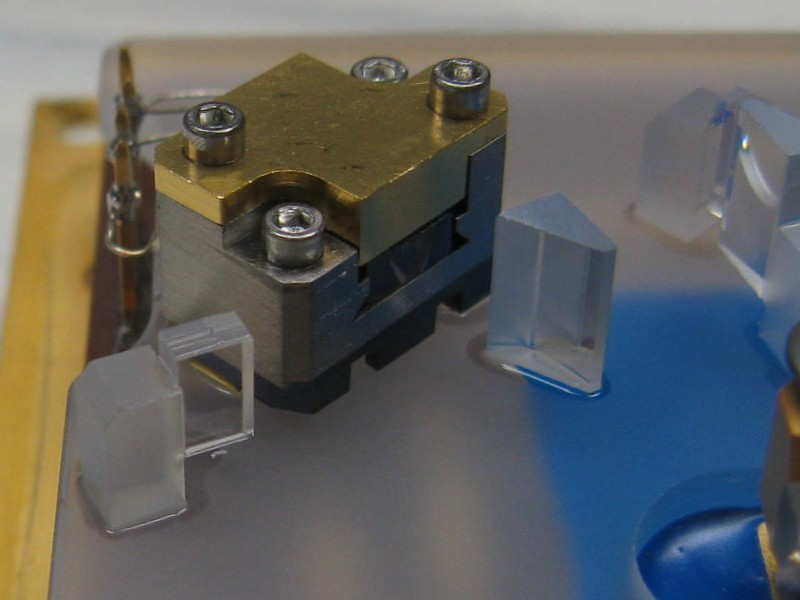
Photograph shows the technique used to mount optics in a Lightwave Electronics single-frequency frequency-doubled laser. The optic in the left foreground is bonded with a thin layer of UV-curing adhesive to a support block, also made of glass, which is bonded to the platform. This design approach allows 5 degrees of freedom for the optic, with a thin adhesive bond.

Early products benefited from relationships with Stanford University and other Bay Area laboratories. The nonplanar ring oscillator technology was invented at Stanford University, and the patent was licensed to Lightwave Electronics. The injection seeding product was developed with cooperation from SRI International and Sandia National Laboratories (Livermore).

Lightwave Electronics is listed as the assignee on 51 United States patents. Several of these relate to active laser stabilization, including stabilization of optical frequency, of intensity, and of pulse repetition rate and pulse energy. Another set relate to laser manufacturing techniques. Early Lightwave Electronics lasers used solder to permanently mount optics in place. Later lasers, such the one shown in the figure, used adhesive cured by ultraviolet light.

Lightwave Electronics' nonplanar ring lasers, and the infrared Q-switched lasers used for DRAM production, were "end-pumped," meaning that the beam from the semiconductor laser pump was co-axial with the beam of the pumped laser. Later lasers, including all of the 355 nm lasers, were side-pumped. Small-diameter (<2 mm) Nd:YAG rods were pumped by powerful (>20 watt), large-aperture semiconductor lasers placed alongside the rods. Lightwave Electronics developed and patented a design enabling efficient side-pumping of a laser while maintaining diffraction-limited output. The end-pumped pumped products were limited in power to less than 1 watt, while side-pumped products have exceeded 20 watts.

Lightwave Electronics made extensive use of the Small Business Innovation Research (SBIR) Program, established in 1982.

== Successor companies ==
Spin-off companies from Lightwave Electronics Corporation include Electro-Optics Technology, of Traverse City MI; Time-Bandwidth Products of Zurich, Switzerland, now a part of Lumentum; and Mobius Photonics, acquired by IPG Photonics. Products sold by Lumentum in 2015 which derive from Lightwave Electronics Corporation products are: the NPRO 125/126 series nonplanar ring lasers, the Q-series Q-switched 355 nm lasers, and the Xcyte quasi-continuous 355 nm lasers.
