= Douglas LaBier =

American psychologist

- Education: B.A., Union College, 1965; Ph.D., State University of New York at Buffalo, Psychology, 1969; Postgraduate National Institute of Mental Health; Psychoanalytic training, Washington School of Psychiatry
- Scientific career
- Fields: Business Psychology
- Workplaces: National Institute of Mental Health; Washington School of Psychiatry

Douglas LaBier is a business psychologist, psychotherapist, and writer. He is known for research demonstrating that success in business and careers can create emotional and values conflicts for men and women.

== Education and Academic Research ==
LaBier was raised in upstate New York. His father, Horace J. LaBier, founded Local 227 of the International Chemical Workers Union in 1937 at a German-owned chemical factory seized by the U.S. government during World War I, and served as its president for 10 terms. "LaBier’s father was frequently accused of being a Communist by the company, and won a well-publicized case before the National Labor Relations Board when the company forbid him to distribute pamphlets to workers containing readings of Spinoza, Aristotle, and Freud."

LaBier received his bachelor's degree from Union College in 1965, and his Ph.D. from the State University of New York at Buffalo and did post-doctoral training at the National Institute of Mental Health, where he served on staff until 1973. He then trained in psychoanalytic psychotherapy at the Washington School of Psychiatry, where he later served on the faculty.

LaBier's research topics have included the relationship between psychopathology and bureaucratic work within the U.S. government, emotional disturbances in bureaucracies, and applications of the emergent cyclical levels of existence theory of Clare W. Graves.

== Career ==
LaBier has written for various publications, particularly The Washington Post, and has been quoted as an expert on topics such as the link between work and mental health; midlife developmental conflicts; building psychologically healthy management and leadership; and positive human development in publications including The New York Times, CBS News and O, The Oprah Magazine His most widely cited work, the book Modern Madness: The Emotional Fallout of Success, describes his seven-year study demonstrating how successful careers within large organizations affect the potential for emotional and values conflict among people who are not otherwise emotionally disturbed.

LaBier founded the Center for Progressive Development as a nonprofit in 1995., and has been a faculty member at the Washington School of Psychiatry since 1980. He also conducts programs for senior executives and leadership teams based on his findings and empirical data to create positive management cultures, and workshops for audiences such as trade associations.

== Works ==
- Modern Madness: The Emotional Fallout Of Success (1986)
- "Madness Stalks the Ladder Climbers", Fortune (September 1986)
- Modern Madness: The Hidden Link Between Work and Emotional Conflict (1989)
- "You've Gotta Think Like Google", The Washington Post (November 11, 2008)
