= Pasquale Pistorio =

Italian semiconductor industry executive (1936–2025)

- Born: 6 January 1936; Agira, Italy
- Died: 26 September 2025 (aged 89); Milan, Italy
- Education: Politecnico di Torino
- Occupation: Company director

Pasquale Pistorio (6 January 1936 – 26 September 2025) was an Italian semiconductor industry executive who was a company director and president of STMicroelectronics, as well as a board member of Confindustria. From 17 April 2007 until 3 December 2007 he was president of Telecom Italia.

== Life and career ==
Pistorio was born in Agira, Italy on 6 January 1936. He graduated in Electronic Engineering at the Politecnico di Torino, his early career was at Motorola where he became the European marketing director in 1967. He later became Director of WorldWide Marketing, Vice President of Motorola Corporation and Director General of the International Semiconductor Division, responsible for planning, production and marketing worldwide excluding the USA.

In 1980 he returned to Italy to lead the SGS group, a microelectronics company that went on to merge with the semiconductor arm of Thompson, a French electronics company, becoming SGS-Thomson Microelectronics (now known as STMicroelectronics), a company, which under his leadership, grew to become one of the leading worldwide manufacturers of semiconductors. In 2005 Pistorio stepped down as CEO and was named honorary president. Two years later he was nominated President of Telecom Italia.

Pistorio served as vice-president of Confindustria for innovation and research from 2005 to 2008. He sat as an independent consultant on the board of Fiat, and also of Chartered Semiconductor. He was also involved with:

- Conseil Stratégique pour l'attractivité du pays auprès du Premier Ministre français
- Internal Advisory Council Singapore Government
- International Business Council of the World Economic Forum
- World Business Council for sustainable development
- Conseil Stratégique des Technologies de l'Information francese
- 'European Round Table of Industrialists (ERT).

He received many honours, including honorary degrees from University of Genova, Malta, Pavia, Catania, Palermo and Sannio.

In April 2005 he founded the Pistorio Foundation. The Foundation is a not-for-profit organization based in Geneva, Switzerland, whose scope is to supply aid in the fields of health, nutrition and education, whether through direct aid, donations or financial or humanitarian support for charities helping children, in the most deprived areas of the world, suffering from war, natural disasters, and other calamities.

Pistorio died in Milan on 26 September 2025, at the age of 89.

== Awards and recognition ==
- Honorary Degree in Electronic Engineering, University of Genoa, 1992
- Honorary degree in Electronic Engineering, University of Pavia, 1998
- He was awarded "il Premio Euno", by the Kiwanis Club of Enna, on its 14th anniversary in 1999.
- He was one of two persons to be the first to be awarded honorary citizenship of Singapore, 2003
- IEEE Robert N. Noyce Medal, IEEE, 2011
