= Pioneer Award (aviation) =

The Pioneer Award is selected by the Professional Group on Aeronautical and Navigational Electronics and has been given out annually since 1949. The Pioneer Award is awarded to an individual or team for significant contributions of interest to the IEEE Aerospace and Electronic Systems Society. To ensure proper historical perspective, the award is given for contributions that have been made at least twenty years prior to the award year.

== Recipients ==
Year	Recipient(s)	Contribution
1949	Thomas C. Rives	Leadership in the development of aircraft electronics
1950	L. M. Clements	Electronic Countermeasures
1951	Harold M. McClelland	“Highways in the Sky”–The forerunner of today's ATC
1952	A. Hoyt Taylor	Use of radio waves for detection of ship traffic (circa 1922)
1953	David G. C. Luck	Radio direction-finding for aircraft and the omnidirectional range
1954	Francis W. Dunmore	Replacement of radio batteries by AC; radio aids to marine and air navigation; blind landing system (today’s ILS)
1955	Lewis M. Hull	Wave propagation to/from aircraft; the Kolster localizer system
1956	Alfred W. Marriner & Wallace G. Smith	Development facilities for aircraft communications, navigation and traffic control including AACS
1956	Harry Diamond (P)	Radio aids to navigation; radio range; direction finding; instrumented low approach
1956	Wayne G. Eaton (P)	Ground and airborne radio equipment
1956	John W. Greig (P)	Automatic phase comparison direction finding
1956	Thorp Hiscock (P)	Two-way voice radio for aircraft
1956	Frederick A. Kolster (P)	Marine radio direction finding; radio compass
1956	William H. Murphy (P)	Airborne antennas and radio range systems
1956	John Stone (P)	Radio direction finding (circa 1900)
1957	Lawrence A. Hyland	Direction finding, altimetry, ignition shielding, and radar
1957	Alessandro Artom (P)	Directional properties of radio transmission and reception (circa 1905)
1958	Albert F. Hegenberger & Clayton C. Shangraw	Four-course radio range beacon
1958	Malcolm P. Hanson (P)	Arctic, Antarctic and transatlantic flight radio communication
1959	Henri G. Busignies & Francis L. Moseley	Aircraft automatic radio direction finding
1960	John H. Dellinger	Aircraft approach and landing electronics
1960	Wilbur L. Webb (P)	Visual “L—R” radio compass
1961	John Alvin Pierce	Radio navigation systems: Loran, Skywave, RaduX, Omega
1962	Donald M. Stuart	VHF omni-range (VOR)
1963	Luis W. Alvarez	Aircraft approach and landing radar
1964	Ernst Ludwig Kramar	Sonne (Consol) and other instrument landing systems (ILS)
1965	Andrew Alford	VOR & ILS navigation antennas; the Alford Loop
1966	Robert J. Dippy	Hyperbolic radio navigation (GEE and LORAN)
1966	Otto Scheller (P)	The radio range (circa 1907)
1967	Lloyd Espenschied & Russell C. Newhouse	Frequency modulated radio altimeters
1968	William J. Tull	Aircraft ground speed using Doppler
1969	William J. O’Brien & Harvey F. Schwarz	DECCA (hyperbolic) navigation
1970	Paul G. Hansel	Doppler VOR
1971	Robert L. Frank & Winslow Palmer	LORAN-C navigation
1972	Myron H. Nichols	Time-division multiplex telemetry
1973	Frederic Calland Williams	Secondary radar beacon design
1973	Bertram Vivian Bowden	Secondary radar system development
1973	Kenneth Ernest Harris (P)	Air traffic control secondary radar
1974	George B. Litchford & Joseph Lyman	Precision omnidirectional microwave beacons
1975	Ivan A. Getting	Microwave radar
1976	Spencer Kellogg II	Zero reader flight display
1977	Robert M. Page	Monostatic radar
1978	Charles S. Draper	Inertial technology
1979	Peter R. Murray	Pilotless aircraft
1980	Sven H. Dodington	Distance measuring equipment
1981	Louis A. deRosa (P), Mortimer Rogoff, Paul E. Green, Jr. & Wilbur B. Davenport, Jr.	Spread-spectrum communications
1982	Arthur A. Collins	Voice and data radio communications and electronics
1983	Allan Ashley, Joseph E. Herrmann & James S. Perry	Voice and data radio communications and electronics
1984	Leroy C. Perkins, Harry B. Smith & David H. Mooney	High-repetition-rate airborne pulse-doppler radar
1985	Carl A. Wiley	Synthetic-aperture radar
1986	William H. Guier, George C. Weiffenbach, Richard B. Kershner (P), & Frank T. McClure (P)	Transit satellite navigation
1987	Rudolph A. Stampfl & Peter H. Werenfels	Weather satellite automatic picture transmission
1988	Charles E. Cook & William M. Siebert	Radar pulse compression
1989	Frederick H. Battle, Jr., Abraham Tatz & Joseph E. Woodward	Microwave landing systems
1990	Jay W. Forrester & Robert R. Everett	The Whirlwind computer
1991	Fred M. Staudaher, Melvin Labitt & Frank R. Dickey, Jr.	Airborne moving-target radars
1992	William C. Eppers	Laser systems
1993	William F. Bahret	Stealth technology
1994	Bradford W. Parkinson	Global Positioning System (GPS)
1995	Robert E. Cowdery & William A. Skillman	Airborne Warning and Control System (AWACS)
1996	Richard B. Marsten	Direct Broadcast Satellites
1997	John H. Bryant (P), James Cheal & Vincent J. McHenry	Subminiature Type A (SMA RF) Coaxial connectors
1998	John N. Entzminger, Charles A. Fowler & William J. Kenneally	Concepts, ideas & designs leading to JointSTARS
1999	Tom M. Hyltin & Britton T. Vincent, Jr.	Monolithic microwave integrated circuits & solid-state phased array radar
2000	Herbert G. Weiss	Space Surveillance Radar Development
2001	Milton E. Radant	Airborne Radar Signal Processing
2002	Joseph A. Meyer	Conceptualization of the Personal Tracking System (PTS)
2003	Russel Boario ; William Brown; Jack L. Walker	
2004	Erwin C. Gangl	For development of MIL-STD-1553: Multiplexed Data Bus Avionic Intra-System Communication Standard
2005	Charles Edward Muehe	For the invention of the Moving Target Detector (MTD) digital signal processor for aircraft surveillance radar
2006	William Fishbein	For developing the fundamental concepts, system designs, and basic technology underpinning the design, development, testing, and fielding of the U.S. Army Firefinder family of radars
2007	George M. Kirkpatrick	For the original development of monopulse techniques for radar systems
2008	Robert D. Briskman	For development of Commercial and Broadcast Satellites Over the Past 40 Years.
2009	Yakov D. Shirman	For the independent discovery of matched filtering, adaptive filtering, and high-resolution pulse compression for an entire generation of Russian and Ukrainian radars.
2010	Daniel A. Tazartes	For Pioneering Contributions to the Development of Strapdown Inertial Instruments
2011	James V. Leonard	For Pioneering Work in the Field of Aircraft/Missile Launch Systems
2012	Asad M. Madni	For Seminal and Pioneering Contributions to the Development and Commercialization of Aerospace Electronic Systems
2013	George Lutes and Kam Lau	For Enabling NASA’s Deep Space Communications and Radar Imaging System via Ultra-Stable Frequency/Timing Fiber Optic Transfer
2014	John Hines	For contributions in the development and deployment of the Very High Speed Integrated Circuits Hardware Description Language (VHDL)
2015	Yakov S. Shifrin	Founding Contributions to Modern Radio Physics and Statistical Antenna Theory (SAT)
2016	William J. Baldygo and Michael C. Wicks	Algorithm Development, Experimental Demonstration, and Transition of Expert System Constant False Alarm Rate (CFAR) to Airborne Radar Systems
2017	Paul Antonik and Gerard T. Capraro	Modeling, Simulation Analysis, Design of a Real-Time Expert System Constant False and Alarm Rate (CFAR)
2018	James J. Spilker	For Contributions to the Technology and Implementation of the GPS Civilian Navigation System.
2019	Azad M. Madni	For contributions to advanced simulation-based training and intelligent decision aiding for aerospace systems.
2020	Alfonso Farina	For pioneering contributions to the analysis, design, development, and experimentation of digital-based adaptive radar systems.

(P) denotes posthumous award.

== See also ==
- List of engineering awards
