= John Travers =

John Travers may refer to:

== Politicians ==
- John Travers (Sheriff of London), Sheriff of London 1224–1225
- John Travers (MP), for Lancashire
- John Travers (New South Wales politician) (1866–1943), Australian politician in New South Wales
- John Travers (1867–1928), Australian politician in South Australia
- John Leo Travers (1899–1979), Australian politician in South Australia

== Others ==
- John Travers (actor) (born 1989), Irish film actor
- John Travers (athlete) (born 1991), Irish middle-distance runner
- John Travers (composer) (1703–1758), English composer, Organist to the Chapel Royal
- John Travers (priest) (died 1727), Archdeacon of Armagh, 1693
- John C. Travers, British physicist
- John Raymond Travers (born 1967), Australian convicted of the 1986 murder of Anita Cobby
