= Kolster =

Kolster may refer to:

- Clarence Kolster (1895–1972), American film editor
- Frederick A. Kolster (1883–1950), American engineer
- Kolster-Brandes
- Kolster Radio Corporation
