= Alfonso Farina =

Italian electronic engineer

- Alfonso Farina during a conference in 2023
- Born: January 25, 1948 (age 78); Petrella Salto Rieti, Italy
- Education: Sapienza University of Rome
- Known for: Radar signal processing Track while scan ECCM; Radar clutter
- Awards: Fred Nathanson Memorial Radar Award (1987); IEEE Dennis J. Picard Medal for Radar Technologies and Applications (2010); IET Achievement Medals (2014); IEEE AESS Pioneer Award (2020)
- Scientific career
- Fields: Electronic engineering
- Workplaces: University of Naples Federico II Selenia; Alenia; AMS jv Selex SI; Selex ES; Finmeccanica Leonardo S.p.A.

Alfonso Farina FREng (born January 25, 1948) is an Italian electronic engineer and former industry manager. He is most noted for the development of the track while scan techniques for radars and generally for the development of a wide range of signal processing techniques used for sensors where tracking plays an essential role. He is author of about 1000 publications. His work was aimed to a synergistic cooperation between industry and academy.

== Biography ==
Alfonso Farina was born in Petrella Salto, a small town near Rieti in 1948. He obtained a doctoral – laurea - degree in electronic engineering on 1973 at University La Sapienza in Rome. In 1974 he joined Selenia, a Finmeccanica company then become Selex ES. Here he held the role of director of the analysis of integrate systems unit and then chief engineer of large business systems division. More recently, he has been the senior VP CTO of the company and then senior advisor to the CTO. From 1979 to 1985 he also was professor ("incaricato") of radar techniques at the University of Naples Federico II.

He retired in October 2014 but currently works as a consultant.

== Work ==
The activity of Alfonso Farina spans a wide range of arguments in the area of radars and sensors. His pioneering work on track while scan, now widely used in all radars, was recounted in a classical set of two books that due to their widespread relevance have gone published also with Russian and Chinese translations. A more recent publication by him also accounts for ideas and applications on adaptive radar signal processing.

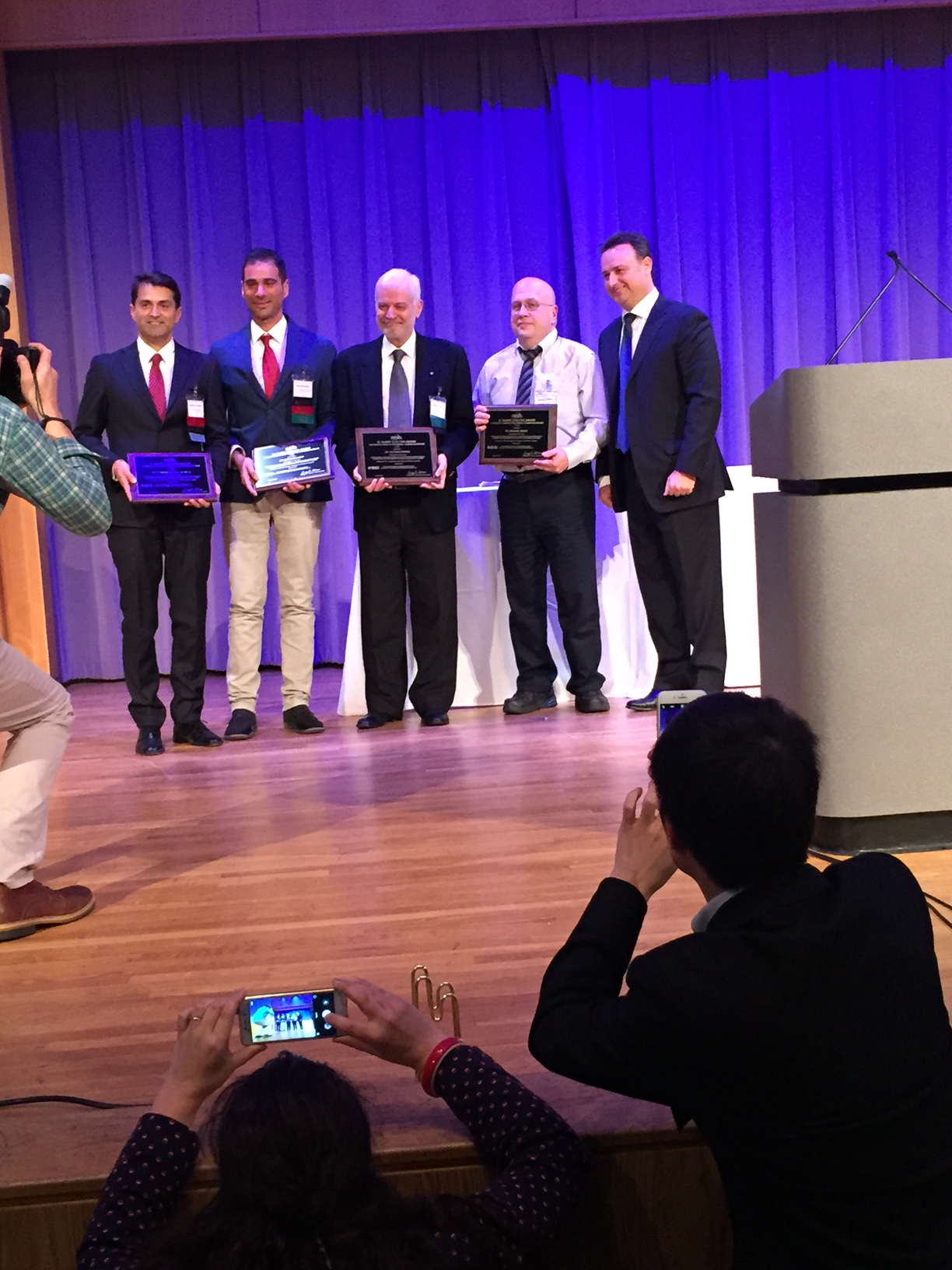
Alfonso Farina (center) receives the IEEE M. Barry Carlton best paper award 2013 on 25 April 2018.

He has also been the contributor to the article on ECCM, invited by Merrill Skolnik, in the second edition of the Radar Handbook (Ch. 9) and the third (Ch. 24)

Together with Artenio Russo, he has generalised the well-known Swerling target fluctuation cases these being special cases.

Together with Sergio Barbarossa, he introduced time-frequency distributions in the analysis of synthetic-aperture radar signals The methods are useful, in particular, for the detection and imaging of objects moving on the Earth, observed from airborne or spaceborne synthetic aperture radars. The approach was later extended to multi-antenna systems, giving rise to space-time-frequency processing.

He is considered the "father" of Italian industrial PCL radar. From 2004 to 2014, he led the team of engineers in conceiving, designing and implementing successive generations of improved PCL radar systems, extensively tested over several years.

Together with Hernandez and Ristic, he extended the theory and calculation of Posterior Cramer-Rao Lower Bound (PCRLB) to the realistic case of detection probability less than 1 and probability of false alarm greater than 0, with practical applications to target tracking.

Together with Luigi Chisci and Giorgio Battistelli he has developed target tracking for radar systems.

In the recent decade, he has contributed to exploit his competence on signal processing in favor of cyber security of integrated systems.

He has been the organizer and general chairman of 2008 IEEE-AESS Radar Conference held in Rome. This was the first time that such conference has been held outside US since its inception on 1974.

Since 2017 till 2023 he is the Chair of Italy Section Chapter, IEEE AESS-10.

Since 2017 (three-year term), he has been in the Editorial Board of the IEEE Signal Processing Magazine.

He is Visiting Professor at University College of London and Cranfield University in UK.

Since 2014, he works as a consultant.

Recently, he gave an interview for the IEEE Aerospace and Electronic Systems Magazine, with Fulvio Gini hosting, recounting of his professional achievements and more.

In October 2018 he was interviewed at Rai Storia for the "70° anniversario di Leonardo Company" ("70th anniversary of Leonardo Company").

He is active in research on quantum radar. Recently, he has been an associate editor of IEEE Aerospace and Electronic Systems Magazine for a special issue on quantum radar, published in two parts, together with Marco Frasca and Bhashyam Balaji.

Currently, he is ranked in the list of 2% top scientists in the World.

He is President of the Radar & Sensors Academy of Leonardo S.p.A. Electronic Division.

From 2022 to 2024 he was President of the Underwater and Sensor Systems Academy of Leonardo S.p.A. Electronic Division.

== Awards and honors ==
Farina is IEEE Fellow since 2000 and International Fellow of the Royal Academy of Engineering since 2005, the latter with the citation "Distinguished for outstanding and continuous innovative in the development of radar signal and data processing techniques and application of these findings in practical systems". He received the award from the hands of Prince Philip, Duke of Edinburgh. From 1997 he is Fellow of IET. Since 2010 he is also Fellow of EURASIP. Starting from 2020, he is fellow member of European Academy of Science.

Since November 2020, he has been named "Académico Correspondiente de la Real Academia de Ingeniería de España".

He is in the Board of Governance of IEEE Aerospace and Electronic Systems Society (2022-2024).

He is part of the IEEE Aerospace and Electronic Systems Standing Committee Chairs as responsible of “Member Service: HISTORY”.

He won the following awards:

- Fred Nathanson Memorial Radar Award, 1987, with the motivation

For development of radar data processing techniques.

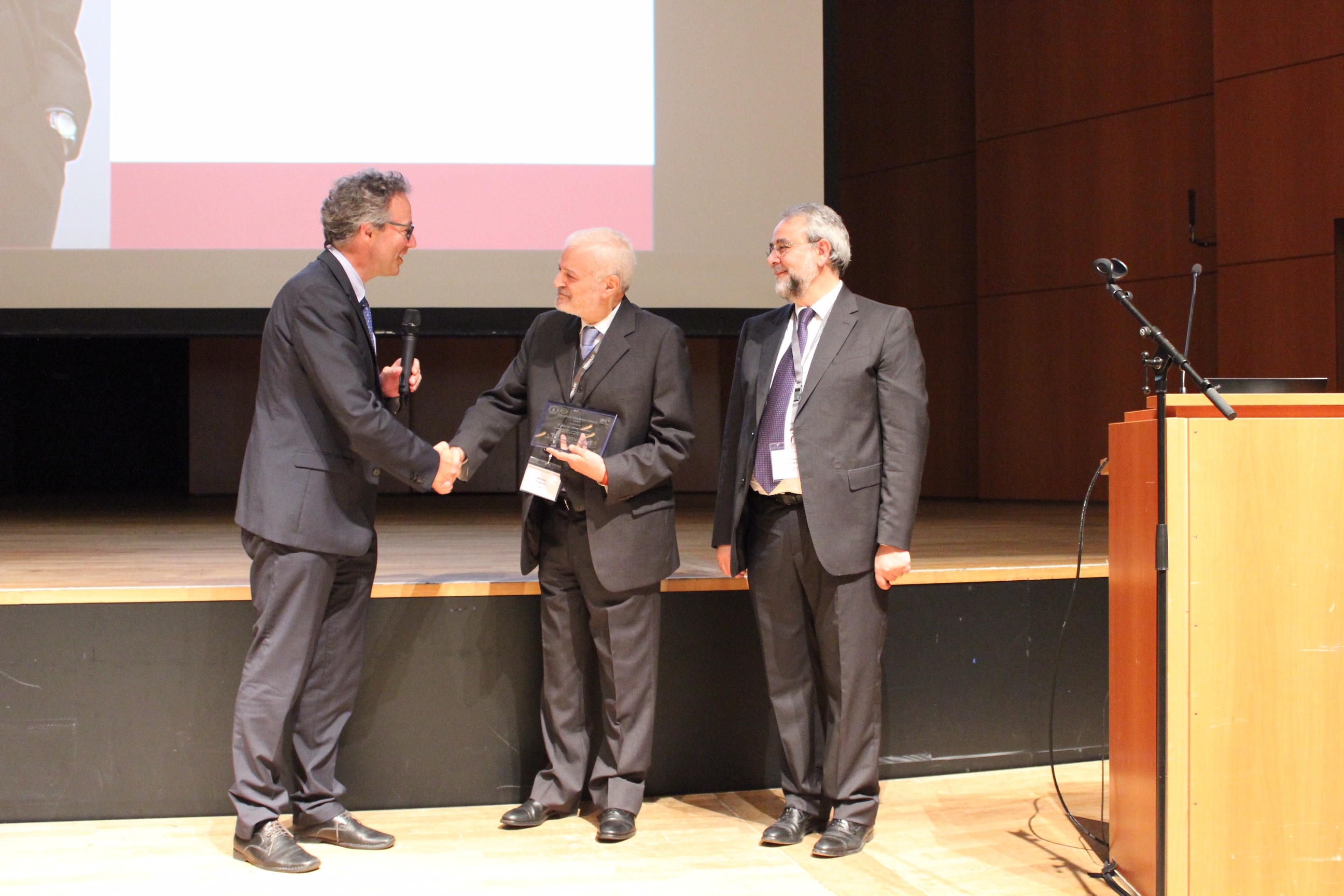
Peter Knott (left), director of the Fraunhofer Institute FHR, presents the Christian Hülsmeyer Award to Alfonso Farina (center). On the right Pierfrancesco Lombardo. (IRS 2019, June, Ulm (Germany))

- M. Barry Carlton Award by IEEE Aerospace and Electronic Systems Society in 2001, 2003 and 2013. This award recognizes the best paper published in the IEEE Transactions on Aerospace and Electronic Systems for the given year.
- Honour of Maestro del Lavoro with decoration of "Stella al Merito del Lavoro" presented to him by the President of Italian Republic in recognition of his outstanding professional career, 2003.
- First Prize Award for Innovation Technology of Finmeccanica Group, 2004, team leader of the winner team presented by the Italian Ministry of Instruction, University and Scientific Research.
- 2006: Annual European Group Technical Achievement Award 2006 by the EURASIP “for development and application of adaptive signal processing techniques in practical radar systems”.
- IEEE Dennis J. Picard Medal for Radar Technologies and Applications, 2010, with the motivation

For continuous, innovative, theoretical and practical contributions to radar systems and adaptive signal processing techniques.

- Co-recipient of Oscar Masi Award for the AULOS “green” radar by the Italian Association for Industrial Research (AIRI) (2012).
- IET Achievement Medals, 2014, with the motivation

For outstanding contributions to radar system design, signal, data and image processing and data fusion.

- IEEE Signal Processing Society Industrial Leader Award, 2017 (presented on 2018), with the motivation

For contributions to radar array processing and industrial leadership.

- Honorary chair of IEEE RadarConf 2020, Florence.
- 2019 Christian Hülsmeyer Award from the German Institute of Navigation (DGON), with the motivation

In appreciation of his outstanding contribution to radar research and education.

- 2020 IEEE AESS Pioneer Award, with the motivation:

For pioneering contributions to the analysis, design, development, and experimentation of digital-based adaptive radar systems.

- 2023 International Member of the United States National Academy of Engineering (NAE), in recognition of distinguished contributions to engineering,“for contributions to the development and deployment of advanced radar systems and technology”
- 2020-2024 Member of the scientific committee of the IEEE Italy Chapter of Signal Processing Society (2020-2024)
- 22 March 2024:
  - Award of the Research Doctorate Honoris Causa in 'ICT Information and Communication Technologies' at the University of Palermo, Department of Engineering (video on Youtube)
  - https://www.unipa.it/dipartimenti/ingegneria/.content/documenti/Docpernews/FascicoloProlusione-PhD-A.-Farina.pdf
- 10 July 2024: he gave the gala dinner speech at the ISIF IEEE International conference on Fusion 2024, Venice, Italy.
- 2025: ISIF Yaakov Bar-Shalom Award for a Lifetime of Excellence in Information Fusion. The award plaque was presented at Intl. Conf FUSION 2025, July 7-11, Rio de Janeiro.
- 2025:IEEE Italy Section Honorary Award for Outstanding contributions to radar signal processing, enhancing adaptive technologies and real-world performance. IEEE Techdefense 2025 / Rome, Italy / November 5–7, 2025.
- 2026: Von Kármán Medal awarded by the NATO Science and Technology Board (STB) in recognition of the exceptional scientific contributions he has made to NATO over his distinguished career.
- 17 October 2026: he gave the plenary speech "Long Friendship with Chinese Colleagues: R&D Cooperation on Radar Science" at the 2026 CIE International Conference on Radar, held in Xi'an, China, from October 16th to October 18th.
