= IEEE Dennis J. Picard Medal for Radar Technologies and Applications =

- Awarded for: Outstanding accomplishments in advancing the fields of radar technologies and their applications
- Presented by: Institute of Electrical and Electronics Engineers
- First award: 1999
- Website: IEEE Dennis J. Picard Medal for Radar Technologies and Applications

The IEEE Dennis J. Picard Medal for Radar Technologies and Applications is an award presented for outstanding accomplishments in advancing the fields of radar technologies and their applications. This award can be presented to an individual or group of up to three people.

The IEEE Board of Directors established the award in 1999. Its name honors Dennis J. Picard, whose lifetime of work at the Raytheon Company helped make them a leader in tactical missile systems.

The criteria considered in the evaluation process include field leadership, contribution, originality, breadth, inventive value, publications, other achievements, society activities, honors, sustained impact, and overall strength of the nomination. There is a 1 July deadline for nominations.

Recipients are typically approved during the November IEEE Board of Directors meeting. Recipients and their nominators are notified following the meeting. Then the nominators of unsuccessful candidates will be notified of the status of their nomination.

The award is presented at the annual IEEE Honors Ceremony.

== Recipients ==
- 2000: Merrill Skolnik
- 2001: Fritz Steudel
- 2002: David K. Barton
- 2003: William A. Skillman
- 2004: David Atlas
- 2005: William J. Caputi, Jr.
- 2006: Eli Brookner
- 2007: Russell K. Raney
- 2008: Yaakov Bar-Shalom
- 2009: Philip M. Woodward
- 2010: Alfonso Farina
- 2011: James Headrick
- 2012: Karl Gerlach
- 2013: Michael C. Wicks
- 2014: Yury Abramovich
- 2015: Marshall Greenspan
- 2016: Nadav Levanon
- 2017: Hugh Griffiths
- 2018: Mark Edward Davis
- 2019: Richard Klemm
- 2020: Joseph R. Guerci
- 2021: Simon Haykin
- 2022: Moeness Amin
- 2023: Alberto Moreira
- 2024: Frederick E. Daum
- 2025: Kamal Sarabandi
- 2026: Yoshio Yamaguchi
