= John Stone Stone =

American mathematician and inventor

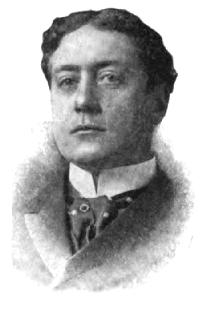
- Stone in 1905
- Born: September 24, 1869; Dover, Virginia
- Died: May 20, 1943 (aged 73); San Diego, California
- Education: Columbia University; Johns Hopkins University
- Awards: IRE Medal of Honor (1923)
- Scientific career
- Fields: Electrical engineering

John Stone Stone (September 24, 1869 – May 20, 1943) was an American mathematician, physicist and inventor. He initially worked in telephone research, followed by influential work developing early radio technology, where he was especially known for improvements in tuning. Despite his often advanced designs, the Stone Telegraph and Telephone Company failed in 1908, and he spent the remainder of his career as an engineering consultant.

== Biography ==
=== Early years ===
Stone was born in Dover (now Manakin) village, in Goochland County, Virginia, the son of Charles Pomeroy Stone, an American Civil War Union general and engineer, and Annie Jeannie [Stone] Stone. From 1870 until 1883, General Stone held the post of Chief of Staff to the khedive of Egypt, and, while growing up in Cairo, John Stone Stone became fluent in Arabic, French, German and Spanish in addition to English. His father tutored him in mathematics, and following the family's return to the United States, Stone attended Columbia Grammar & Preparatory School in New York City, after which he studied civil engineering for two years at the Columbia University School of Mines, followed by two years at Johns Hopkins University, where he studied mathematics, physics and theoretical and applied electricity.

=== Telephone work ===
After completing his education, in 1890 he began working at the American Bell Telephone Co. in Boston, Massachusetts, in the experimental department of its Research and Development Laboratory. While there, drawing on the work of Oliver Heaviside, he made a rigorous mathematical analysis of the company's development of a long-distance telephone link between New York and Chicago. His later work involved electrical resonance, which he initially investigated for its potential use in an automatic telephone exchange. In 1892, he attempted to wirelessly transmit audio using "high frequency transmissions". This effort was unsuccessful, but the work proved applicable to the development of "wired wireless" (also known as "carrier current") transmissions over telephone lines, although his patent application was later ruled to have been anticipated by Major George O. Squier. In 1893, he developed a "common battery" system for telephone use, which provided, from a central location, the electric current needed to operate subscribers' phones. From 1896 to 1906 he also gave an annual short course of instruction in electrical resonance at the Massachusetts Institute of Technology to graduating classes in physics and electrical engineering.

=== Radio development ===
In 1899, Stone resigned from his telephone company position and began to work in Boston as an independent consulting engineer, although he was also retained by his former employer as a "Consultant and Expert in patent causes". His first client was Herman W. Ladd, who was attempting to perfect his "Telelocograph" system for using radio signals as "wireless lighthouses" and for navigational direction-finding. Ladd's approach turned out to be impractical, but the work gave Stone insight about the difficulties facing the embryonic technology of radiotelegraphic signalling, and he recognized that his earlier work on resonant circuits on telephone lines could be applied to improve radio transmitter and receiver designs. Moreover, unlike most other early radio experimenters, Stone had the mathematical background needed to fully analyze electrical circuits.

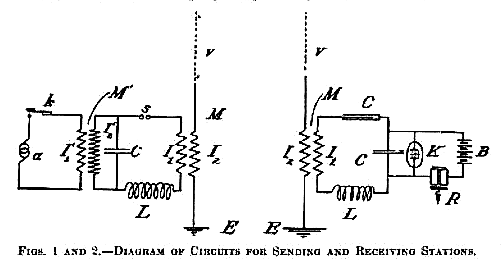
Schematic for four-circuit tuning (1903)

In late 1900, the Stone Wireless Telegraphy Syndicate was started in Boston, with an initial funding of $10,000, to do experimental work in devising a commercial system. Stone used his knowledge of electrical tuning to develop a "high selectivity" approach to reduce the amount of interference caused by static and signals from other stations. Starting with Tesla-style open-core electrical transformers, he developed adjustable "selective four-circuit tuning" that employed "loose coupling" to help insure that the transmitter and receiver were operating on a single common frequency. (In some cases an extra intermediary "weeding out" circuit was added, for additional selectivity. In contrast, transmitters operated by most other companies employed "close coupling" that produced signals on two separate frequencies). He also took special care to mathematically analyze transmitter and receiver designs to increase efficiency and reduce losses. In early 1900, he applied for a U.S. patent for his tuning work, which was divided into three patents that were issued in 1901 and 1902.

In mid-1902 the Stone Telegraph and Telephone Company, also based in Boston, was formed, in order to begin commercial operations. Stone acted as Chief Engineer, and two stations separated by sixteen kilometers (ten miles) were constructed at Cambridge and Lynn, Massachusetts. Beginning in 1905, demonstration radiotelegraph stations, using spark transmitters and electrolytic detectors, were installed for evaluation by the U.S. Navy. By the end of 1906, the government had purchased five ship and three land installations.

The company's first commercial radiotelegraph link was between the Isle of Shoals and Portsmouth, New Hampshire, which operated during the summer of 1905, replacing a failed Western Union telegraph cable. In 1907 Stone founded, and served as the president of, the Society of Wireless Telegraph Engineers (SWTE), which was created as an educational resource for his company's employees. (This organization would be merged with the New York-based "The Wireless Institute" in 1912, creating the Institute of Radio Engineers.) In 1906 the company tested a ship-borne "direction-finder" designed by Stone that, although fairly accurate, proved impractical as it required the entire ship to turn in order to take readings.

Operating as a small independent concern, Stone found that he could not keep up with the advances in the industry, and in 1908 his company suspended operations, and was placed into receivership. Its assets, including its valuable portfolio of patents, were sold to Lee DeForest's Radio Telephone Company, for $10,000 cash and $300,000 of stock.

In early 1911, he moved to New York City, once again working as a consultant. He also gained prominence as an independent expert, testifying in numerous radio patent cases. In 1912, he acted as an intermediary, making arrangements for Lee DeForest to demonstrate an early version of his three-electrode audion vacuum-tube to AT&T engineers, who re-engineered the device into an amplifier that was capable of establishing transcontinental telephone service. In 1914–1915 Stone served as president of the Institute of Radio Engineers.

=== Later life ===
In 1919 he permanently moved to San Diego, California, where his ailing mother resided. Here he became "an associate at large of the Department of Development & Research of the American Telephone and Telegraph Company" until his retirement in 1934.

Once married and divorced, Stone died in San Diego, California on May 20, 1943, and was buried in Mt. Hope cemetery alongside his mother Jeanne Stone and sister Egypta Stone Wilson. Shortly after his death, the U.S. Supreme Court upheld a 1935 decision by the Court of Claims, which ruled that his 1900 tuning patent had priority over the U.S. counterpart (763,772) to Marconi's "four sevens" patent.

== Legacy ==
John Stone Stone was issued about 120 patents in the United States, and a similar number in other countries, covering telegraph and telephone devices and radio technology. He won the Franklin Institute Edward Longstreth Medal in 1913. He was also awarded the Institute of Radio Engineers' Medal of Honor in 1923, "For his valuable pioneer contributions to the radio art", and at the presentation ceremony, Frederick A. Kolster acknowledged his contributions with the following: "No man has contributed more to the advancement of the Radio Science than has John Stone Stone, and no man is more thoroughly entitled to the full and grateful appreciation of the entire Radio World."

== Other activities ==
Among his political and other activities, he served as a member of the American Defense Society's Board of Trustees. He was also a fellow of the American Academy of Arts and Sciences, a fellow of the American Association for the Advancement of Science; past president and vice-president of the Society of Wireless Telegraph Engineers; vice-president of the Wireless Telegraph Association of America; member of the American Electrochemical Society; Associate of the American Institute of Electrical Engineers; member of the Society of Arts of the Massachusetts Institute of Technology; member of the Mathematical and Physical Club; the Alpha Delta Phi fraternity, the Johns Hopkins Alumni Association of New England and a hereditary member of the Aztec Club of 1847.

He was also a member of the St. Botolph, Technology and Papyrus clubs of Boston, the National Arts Club of New York, the Army and Navy Club, and Cosmos Club of Washington, D.C.

== Publications by John Stone Stone ==
- "Theory of Wireless Telegraphy", Transactions of the 1904 Saint Louis International Electrical Congress, Volume III, pages 555–577.
- "Interference In Wireless Telegraphy", Transactions of the Canadian Society of Civil Engineers. Montreal: Canadian Society of Civil Engineers, March 9, 1905, pages 164–182.
- "The Periodicities and Damping Coefficients of Coupled Oscillators". Read before the Society of Wireless Telegraph Engineers. Electrical Review & Western Electrician, December 3, 1910 (No. 19098), pages 1145–1149. (ed., Deduces expressions for the damping coefficients and periodicities of two coupled oscillators which will yield correct results in all practical cases.)
- "Notes on the Oscillation Transformer", Electrical World, January 19, 1911 (No. 20296) pages 175–177. (ed., Mathematical determination of the constants of oscillation transformers used in wireless telegraphy.)
- "Maximum Current In The Secondary of a Transformer", Society of Wireless Telegraph Engineers held at Boston, Massachusetts, American Institute of Physics, American Physical Society, & Cornell University, Physical Review, Lancaster, Pennsylvania. [etc.]: Published for the American Physical Society by the American Institute of Physics [etc.], Volume XXXII No. 4 (April 1911), pages 398–405.
- "An Expert's Views" (April 18, 1912, correspondence), Electrician and Mechanic, June 1912, page 418. Boston, Massachusetts, Sampson Publishing Co.
- "The Practical Aspects of The Propagation of High-frequency Electric Waves Along Wires", Journal of the Franklin Institute, Vol. CLXXIV No. 4 (October 1912), pages 353–384.
- ""The Resistance of the Spark and Its Effect on the Oscillations of Electrical Oscillators", Proceedings of the Institute of Radio Engineers, Volume 2 By Institute of Radio Engineers, May 13, 1914, pages 307–324. (ed., Abstract of paper read before the Institute of Radio Engineers)

== Patents ==
List of patents
- U.S. patent 0,469,475 – Electric cable (1892)
- U.S. patent 0,487,102 – Development and distribution of electricity (1892)
- U.S. patent 0,577,214 – Resonant electric circuit (1897)
- Stone, M S, Electric Circuit, US patent 0 578 275, filed September 10, 1896, issued March 2, 1897.
- U.S. patent 0,623,579 – Differential electromagnet (1899)
- U.S. patent 0,714,756 – Method of selective electric signaling (1902)
- U.S. patent 0,714,831 – Apparatus for selective signalling (1902)
- U.S. patent 0,714,832 – Apparatus for amplifying electromagnetic signal waves (1902)
- U.S. patent 0,714,833 – Apparatus for amplifying electromagnetic signal waves (1902)
- U.S. patent 0,714,834 – Apparatus for selective electric signaling (1902)
- U.S. patent 0,716,134 – Method of determining the direction of space-telegraph signals (1902)
- U.S. patent 0,717,467 – Method of electrical distribution (1902)
- U.S. patent 0,717,509 – Method of relaying space telegraph signals (1902)
- U.S. patent 0,717,510 – Method of relaying space telegraph signals (1902)
- U.S. patent 0,717,511 – Method of tuning vertical wire oscillators (1902)
- U.S. patent 0,717,512 – Tuned electric oscillator (1902)
- U.S. patent 0,717,513 – Method of relaying space telegraph signals (1902)
- U.S. patent 0,717,514 – Apparatus for relaying space telegraph signals (1902)
- U.S. patent 0,717,515 – Method of electrical distribution (1902)
- U.S. patent 0,726,476 – Electrical distribution and selective distribution
- U.S. patent 0,729,103 – Method of electrical distribution and selective distribution
- U.S. patent 0,729,104 – Electrical apparatus and circuit for electrical distribution and selective distribution
- U.S. patent 0,767,970 – Apparatus for simultaneously transmitting and receiving space telegraph signals (1904)
- U.S. patent 0,767,971 – Wireless telegraph receiving device (1904)
- U.S. patent 0,767,972 – Method of receiving space telegraph signals (1904)
- U.S. patent 0,767,973 – Method of increasing the effective radiation of electromagnetic waves (1904)
- U.S. patent 0,767,974 – Apparatus for increasing the effective radiation of electromagnetic waves (1904)
- U.S. patent 0,767,975 – Space telegraphy (1904)
- U.S. patent 0,767,976 – Space telegraphy (1904)
- U.S. patent 0,767,977 – Space telegraphy (1904)
- U.S. patent 0,767,978 – Space telegraphy (1904)
- U.S. patent 0,767,979 – Space telegraphy (1904)
- U.S. patent 0,767,980 – Space telegraphy (1904)
- U.S. patent 0,767,981 – Space telegraphy (1904)
- U.S. patent 0,767,982 – Space telegraphy (1904)
- U.S. patent 0,767,983 – Space telegraphy (1904)
- U.S. patent 0,767,984 – Space telegraphy (1904)
- U.S. patent 0,767,985 – Space telegraphy (1904)
- U.S. patent 0,767,986 – Space telegraphy (1904)
- U.S. patent 0,767,987 – Space telegraphy (1904)
- U.S. patent 0,767,988 – Space telegraphy (1904)
- U.S. patent 0,767,989 – Space telegraphy (1904)
- U.S. patent 0,767,990 – Space telegraphy (1904)
- U.S. patent 0,767,991 – Space telegraphy (1904)
- U.S. patent 0,767,992 – Space telegraphy (1904)
- U.S. patent 0,767,993 – Space telegraphy (1904)
- U.S. patent 0,767,994 – Space telegraphy (1904)
- U.S. patent 0,767,995 – Space telegraphy (1904)
- U.S. patent 0,767,996 – Space telegraphy (1904)
- U.S. patent 0,767,997 – Space telegraphy (1904)
- U.S. patent 0,767,998 – Space telegraphy (1904)
- U.S. patent 0,767,999 – Space telegraphy (1904)
- U.S. patent 0,768,000 – Space telegraphy (1904)
- U.S. patent 0,768,001 – Space telegraphy (1904)
- U.S. patent 0,768,002 – Space telegraphy (1904)
- U.S. patent 0,768,003 – Space telegraphy (1904)
- U.S. patent 0,768,004 – Space telegraphy (1904)
- U.S. patent 0,768,005 – Space telegraphy (1904)
- U.S. patent 0,802,417 – Space telegraphy (1905)
- U.S. patent 0,802,418 – Space telegraphy (1905)
- U.S. patent 0,802,419 – Space telegraphy (1905)
- U.S. patent 0,802,420 – Space telegraphy (1905)
- U.S. patent 0,802,421 – Space telegraphy (1905)
- U.S. patent 0,802,422 – Space telegraphy (1905)
- U.S. patent 0,802,423 – Space telegraphy (1905)
- U.S. patent 0,802,424 – Space telegraphy (1905)
- U.S. patent 0,802,425 – Space telegraphy (1905)
- U.S. patent 0,802,426 – Space telegraphy (1905)
- U.S. patent 0,802,427 – Space telegraphy (1905)
- U.S. patent 0,802,428 – Space telegraphy (1905)
- U.S. patent 0,802,429 – Space telegraphy (1905)
- U.S. patent 0,802,430 – Space telegraphy (1905)
- U.S. patent 0,802,431 – Space telegraphy (1905)
- U.S. patent 0,802,432 – Space telegraphy (1905)
- U.S. patent 0,884,106 – Space telegraphy (1908)
- U.S. patent 0,884,107 – Space telegraphy (1908)
- U.S. patent 0,884,108 – Space telegraphy (1908)
- U.S. patent 0,884,109 – Space telegraphy (1908)
- U.S. patent 0,884,110 – Space telegraphy (1908)
- U.S. patent 1,565,521 – Secret communication system (1925)
- U.S. patent 1,605,010 – Signaling system (1926)
- U.S. patent 1,683,739 – Directive antenna array (1928)
- U.S. patent 1,789,419 – Radio receiving system (1931)
- U.S. patent 1,954,898 – Radio receiving system (1934)
- U.S. patent 2,023,556 – Frequency selective communication system (1935)
- U.S. patent 2,026,712 – Composite oscillator for electromagnetic wave (1936)

== See also ==
Main
Invention of radio, electromagnetic waves, mutual inductance, high frequency, alternating current
General
bolometer, Lloyd Espenschied, Boston Navy Yard
Radio
spark gap transmitter, break key, wireless telegraph, antenna
