= Russell C. Newhouse =

American aviator and engineer

1965 Dancing in Kwajalein

Russell Conwell Newhouse (1906–1998) made many contributions to the advancement of aviation in a distinguished career running from the late 1920s into the 1970s. He was the Director of the Radar Laboratory for the Bell Telephone Laboratories from 1958 to 1968.

== Biography ==
Newhouse was born in Clyde, Ohio, on December 17, 1906. At the age of ten, he moved with his parents to a farm in Delaware County near Ostrander, where he completed his elementary and high school education.

He matriculated at Ohio State University in 1925, graduating in 1929 with a Bachelor of Science in Electrical Engineering degree. His senior thesis, "An Electromagnetic Altimeter", based on the work of Professor W. L. Everitt, was on the subject of a frequency-modulated radio altimeter for aircraft. He was hired by Bell Laboratories as a member of the technical staff in the Toll Systems Department of the Laboratories. After three months, he returned to Ohio State under a Fellowship granted by the Guggenheim Fund for the Promotion of Aeronautics to permit work with Professor Everitt to develop the radio altimeter. He received a Master of Science in Electrical Engineering degree in 1930.

While at Ohio State, he joined the Alpha Nu chapter of Pi Kappa Phi fraternity and is considered a notable Pi Kappa Phi.

He received the 1938 Lawrence B. Sperry award for the development and first practical application of the radio altimeter. In 1939, he transferred to the television research group at Bell Laboratories. With the approach of war emergency in 1940, he returned to Specialty Products at Bell Laboratories, where he supervised the circuit development of a number of radars for aircraft and ground service. By 1947, he was directing the efforts of a group engaged in the development of radar for commercial applications and of radio-telephone sets for aircraft and shipboard service. He published an article titled "A Voyage by Radar" in the Bell Laboratories Record Vol. XXV No. 5 - May 1947 describing the installation of radar in 1946 on the John T. Hutchinson, one of the (new in 1946) 12,000 ton capacity ships of the Buckeye Steamship Company to demonstrate the advantages of radar as a navigational aid on the Great Lakes.

1961, he was appointed by the FAA Administrator Najeeb Halaby to be a member of Project Beacon, a group which published the "Report of the Task Force on Air Traffic Control" in October 1961. This report made recommendations for the future of the nation's air navigation and traffic control system.

He was a member of the Millburn Township, New Jersey School Board for many years, and was its president for four of those years.

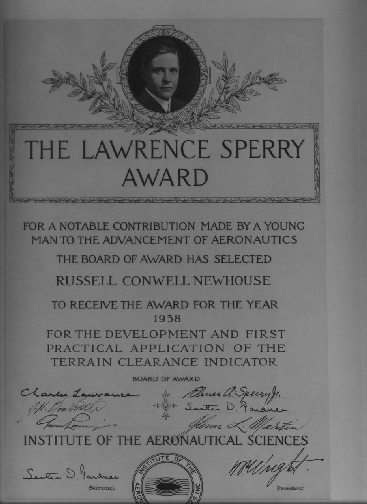
1938 Lawrence Sperry Award Certificate

Newhouse and his wife Clara Lucille have one son, Alan, now a retired senior executive service civilian in the US government whose career focused on nuclear propulsion within the Navy, Atomic Energy Commission, Department of Energy, and NASA.

== Major projects ==
Newhouse was responsible for the development of all of the radars of the Nike Zeus Anti-Missile Missile Defense System, including being responsible for field support, test planning, and data analysis for the Zeus radars in operation at Ascension Island in the South Atlantic: White Sands Missile Range in New Mexico, and Kwajalein Atoll Marshall Islands in the Pacific Ocean. He was also responsible for the development of the Missile Site Array Radar of the Nike X Anti-Missile Defense System.

== Awards ==
- Recipient of the 1967 Pioneer Award Aviation along with Lloyd Espenshied for his work on frequency modulated radio altimeters
- Recipient of The Lawrence Sperry Award – 1938
- The Ohio State University Distinguished Alumni Award, 1959

== Patents ==
Title	Co-author	Patent number	Filing date	Issue date	Assignor(s) to
System and Method of Determining Distances	William C. Tinus	2083344	Apr 6, 1934	Jun 8, 1937	Bell Telephone Laboratories
Radiant Energy Distance Measuring System	William H.C. Higgins	2206896	Nov 16, 1938	Jul 9, 1940	Bell Telephone Laboratories
Radiant Energy Distance Measuring System	Richard F. Lane	2206903	Nov 16, 1938	Jul 9, 1940	Bell Telephone Laboratories
Measurement of Frequency Modulated Waves		2218923	Jul 26, 1939	Oct 22, 1940	Bell Telephone Laboratories
Radio Speed and Drift Indicator		2223224	Jun 24, 1939	Nov 1940	Bell Telephone Laboratories
Radiant Energy Distance Measuring System		2247662	Nov 16, 1938	Jul 1, 1941	Bell Telephone Laboratories
Radiant Energy Distance Measuring System		2261272	Aug 7, 1940	Nov 4, 1941	Bell Telephone Laboratories
Aircraft Blind Landing System		2405231	Mar 31, 1942	Aug 6, 1946	Bell Telephone Laboratories
Altitude Guiding System for Aircraft		2416342	Dec 3, 1941	Feb 25, 1947	Bell Telephone Laboratories
Distance Measuring System		2426232	Feb 5, 1944	Aug 1947	Bell Telephone Laboratories
Canadian Patents Database – AIRCRAFT BLIND LANDING SYSTEM		CPC 343/76		Jan 13, 1948	Bell Telephone Laboratories
Observer-Controlled Television System	Frederick W. Reynolds	2516069	Jul 29, 1947	Jul 1950	Bell Telephone Laboratories
Voltage Supply Apparatus	Joseph E. Corbin	2532697	Sep 11, 1948	Dec 5, 1950	Bell Telephone Laboratories
Deflecting System		2821657	May 16, 1955	Jan 1958	Bell Telephone Laboratories
Deflection Circuit for Cathode Ray Tubes	Keith R. Carpenter, Richard F. Lane	2954502	Nov 10, 1958	Sep 27, 1960	Bell Telephone Laboratories
Proportional Navigation Computer		3013722	Jan 18, 1957	Dec 19, 1961	Secretary of the Navy
Vectoring Phase Simulator		2971269	Jan 18, 1957	Feb 14, 1961	Secretary of the Navy
