= Mona Jarrahi =

Iranian engineer (born 1979)

- Born: 1979 (age 46–47); Tehran
- Education: Stanford University (Ph.D.), 2007; Stanford University (M.S.), 2003; Sharif University of Technology (B.S.), 2000
- Known for: Terahertz optoelectronics
- Scientific career
- Workplaces: University of California, Los Angeles; University of Michigan
- Thesis: Optical spatial quantization for higher performance analog to digital conversion (2007)

Mona Jarrahi (Persian: مونا جراحی; Jan 1979) is an Iranian Engineering professor at the University of California, Los Angeles. She investigates novel materials, terahertz/millimeter-wave electronics and optoelectronics, microwave photonics, imaging and spectroscopy systems.

Jarrahi was honored with the Presidential Early Career Award for Scientists and Engineers (PECASE) in 2013 for her work on Terahertz Optoelectronics.

== Early life and career ==
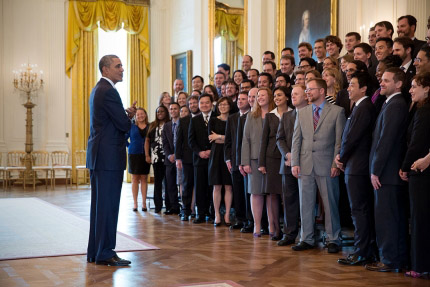
Presidential Early Career Award for Scientists and Engineers in 2014

Jarrahi was born in Tehran and received her high school education in Iran. In 1995 she got a silver medal at the Iranian National Physics Olympiad. She got her B.S. degree in Electrical Engineering from Sharif University of Technology in 2000. She then joined Stanford University in 2001 as a graduate student where she got her MS and Ph.D. in Electrical Engineering in 2003 and 2007, respectively. In 2016 she received the "Sharif University of Technology Distinguished Alumni Award".

She served as a Postdoctoral Scholar at the University of California, Berkeley from 2007 to 2008. After earning her Ph.D., Jarrahi joined University of Michigan Ann Arbor as an assistant professor (2008–2013). Afterward, she joined UCLA as an associate professor (2013–2017) and from 2017 she became a professor at UCLA in the Electrical and Computer Engineering Department.

Prof. Jarrahi has made contributions to the development of ultrafast electronic/optoelectronic devices and integrated systems for terahertz/millimeter-wave sensing, imaging, computing, and communication systems by utilizing novel materials, nanostructures, and quantum well structures as well as innovative plasmonic and optical concepts. The use of advanced terahertz imaging systems for early-stage detection of cancerous tumors is a subject she has been working on it.

Jarrahi is a Fellow Member of the Institute of Electrical and Electronics Engineers (IEEE), an Honorary Member of the IEEE Eta Kappa Nu (ΗΚΝ), and Fellow Member of the Optical Society of America (OSA), a Fellow Member of the International Society of Optical Engineers (SPIE) and a Member of the American Physical Society (APS).

== Awards and recognition ==
On 23 December 2013, Jarrahi was honored with the Presidential Early Career Award for Scientists and Engineers (PECASE) award from the President of the United States, Barack Obama. She was one of 102 scientists and engineers to receive this award in 2013. The presidential award committee cited her work in Terahertz Optoelectronics.

Among the many awards and recognition Prof. Jarrahi received are in this table

Year	Award/Recognition
2005	Photonic Technology Access Program Research Award
2007	Best Student Paper Award, 1st place, International Microwave Symposium
2008	Best paper award Berkeley Sensor and Actuator Center industry advisory board meeting
2010	Defense Advanced Research Projects Agency (DARPA) Young Faculty Award
2011	National Science Foundation (NSF) Faculty Early Career Development Award
2012	Office of Naval Research (ONR) Young Investigator Award
2012	Army Research Office (ARO) Young Investigator Award
2012	Elizabeth Crosby Research Award, University of Michigan
2013	National Academy of Engineering (NAE), The Grainger Foundation Frontiers of Engineering Award
2013	Presidential Early Career Award for Scientists and Engineers
2014	Kavli Fellow by the National Academy of Sciences
2014	Booker Fellowship from the United States National Committee of the International Union of Radio Science (USNC/URSI)
2014	IEEE Nanotechnology Council Early Career Award in Nanotechnolog
2014	IEEE Microwave Theory and Techniques Society Outstanding Young Engineer Award
2015	Alexander von Humboldt Foundation Friedrich Wilhelm Bessel Research Award
2015	Lot Shafai Mid-Career Distinguished Achievement Award from IEEE Antennas and Propagation Society (AP-S)
2015	Best Student Paper Award, 3rd place, International Conference on Infrared, Millimeter, and Terahertz Waves
2016	Sharif University of Technology Distinguished Alumni Award
2016	Moore Inventor Fellowship
2016	Popular Mechanics Breakthrough Award
2017	Fellow of the Optical Society of America (OSA)
2017	Okawa Foundation Research Award
2017	Watanabe Excellence in Research Award from UCLA School of Engineering and Applied Science
2018	Fellow of the International Society for Optical Engineering (SPIE)
2019	Fellow of Institute of Electrical and Electronics Engineers (IEEE)
2019	Burroughs Wellcome Fund's Innovations in Regulatory Science Award
2020	Fellow of the Institute of Physics (IoP)
2020	Catalyzing Pediatric Innovation Award
2021	UCLA Faculty Innovation Fellow
2021	IET A F Harvey Engineering Research Prize
2022	SPIE Harold E. Edgerton Award in High-Speed Optics
2022	Fellow of the American Physical Society
