= IET A F Harvey Prize =

Annual engineering research prize

The IET A. F. Harvey Engineering Research Prize is a global engineering research prize awarded annually to an innovative researcher by the Institution of Engineering and Technology. It was named after an engineer, Arthur Frank Harvey.

The award was made for the first time in 2011 and one award is made each year. Between 2011 and 2015 the prize money was £300,000. From 2016, the prize increased to £350,000.

The prize follows a three-year cycle, as follows:

- Year one: Medical engineering
- Year two: Microwaves and radar
- Year three: Lasers and optoelectronics

== Conditions ==
The prize money is to be used for the furtherance of scientific research into the fields of medical, microwave, laser or radar engineering.

The IET A F Harvey Engineering Prize committee searches for potential candidates from around the world for the prize, drawing on wide international networks. The committee draws up a short-list of candidates from whom additional information is requested for further detailed consideration. The selection takes into account outstanding achievement and potential for further substantial advances in engineering and technology to the benefit of society.

== List of recipients ==
Source: IET

Year	Recipient	University	Rationale
2011	Edward Boyden	Massachusetts Institute of Technology, USA	For his pioneering research contributions to, and development of, the field of optogenetics, which has the potential to enable new approaches to therapy.
2012	Hugh Duncan Griffiths	University College London, UK	For his outstanding contributions to radar research and his continuing work to make major improvements in bistatic radar and its applications.
2013	Stuart Wenham	ARC Photovoltaic Centre of Excellence, University of New South Wales, Australia	In recognition of his outstanding contributions to research in the field of lasers and optoelectronics, specifically for his pioneering laser use in advanced silicon solar cell contact formation.
2014	Eleanor Stride	University of Oxford, UK	In recognition of her outstanding contributions to research in the field of medical engineering, specifically in biomedical ultrasound and the development of novel agents and fabrication techniques for drug delivery systems engineering.
2015	Yang Hao	Queen Mary University, UK	In recognition of his research achievements in microwaves, antennas and, in particular, metamaterial antenna innovations drawing inspiration from transformation optics.
2016	Arseniy Kuznetsov	A*STAR's Data Storage Institute, Singapore	In recognition of his outstanding contributions to research in the field of Lasers and Optoelectronics, as well as pioneering research on dielectric nanoantennas, a new branch of nanophotonics, which studies the behaviour and use of light in nanoscale projects.
2017	Rui L. Reis	University of Minho, Portugal	For his outstanding contributions to research in the field of medical engineering
2018	Mario Silveirinha	University of Lisbon, Portugal	In recognition of his outstanding contributions to research in the field of Radar and Microwave Engineering, specifically in the electrodynamics of metamaterials and its applications to microwave components and devices.
2019	Jelena Vučković	Stanford University, California	For her work in nanoscale and quantum photonics.
2020	Grégoire Courtine	École Polytechnique Fédérale de Lausanne (EPFL), Switzerland	For his contributions in the field of neuro-rehabilitation and the restoration of movement in paralyzed patients following spinal cord injury.
2021	Mona Jarrahi	Terahertz Electronics Laboratory, University of California, Los Angeles	For her outstanding contributions to research in the field of radar and microwave engineering.
2022	John C. Travers	Heriot-Watt University, UK	For his outstanding contributions to research in the field of lasers and optoelectronics.
2023	Rachel McKendry	London Centre for Nanotechnology and the Division of Medicine, University College London, UK	

== See also ==
- List of engineering awards
