= William Baldygo =

American electrical engineer

William J. Baldygo is an electrical engineer at U.S. Air Force Research Laboratory, Dayton, Ohio.

== Education ==
Baldygo obtained his BSc. in electrical engineering from Clarkson University in Potsdam, New York in 1990. Couple years later, he was enrolled into Master's program at Syracuse University, from which he graduated with the degree in electrical engineering in 1996. He decided to remain at the alma mater to pursue Master's of Arts degree in public administration, which he was awarded with in 2005. Following it, Baldygo went to Air War College, Air University of Maxwell Air Force Base in Alabama. While there, he obtained Level I certification in Program Management, with keen specialty in testing and evaluation and a Level III certification in engineering with the specialty in science and technology management, all in 2008.

== Career ==
After obtaining his BSc. in electrical engineering, Baldygo served as research engineer at the Radar Signal Processing Branch of Rome Laboratory. He was then promoted to technical advisor, and remained on the post until 2005 when he became its chief. After serving for a year as chief at Rome Laboratory, Baldygo was relocated to the Surveillance Radar Technology Branch in Wright-Patterson Air Force Base, Ohio, where he served as acting chief from 2009 to 2010. From 2010 to 2013, he served as program chief engineer at Systems Technology Office of the Air Force Research Laboratory and from 2013 to 2015 was a deputy director of the Engineering and Technical Management at the same air base. Between those years, he also served as co-chair of the IEEE Dayton Section from 2011 to 2014 and after serving as global deputy capacity lead at the Institute for Strategy and Reconciliation for two years, Baldygo became chief of the Multi-Domain Sensing Autonomy Division of AFRL. In 2018 he became senior scientist at the Radio Frequency Sensing Technology.

== Awards and honors ==
Baldygo was named Fellow of the Institute of Electrical and Electronics Engineers (IEEE) in 2016 for leadership in signal processing for radar systems. He is also a member of the United States Geospatial Intelligence Foundation and the Association of Old Crows.
