= Data Storage Institute =

Singaporean research institute

The Data Storage Institute (DSI) (1997–2018) was a national research and development organisation located in Singapore, that studied data storage technologies.

== History ==
DSI was established in April 1997 through the expansion of the Magnetics Technology Centre (MTC), founded in June 1992 by the Agency for Science, Technology & Research, or A*STAR (then known as the National Science & Technology Board) and the National University of Singapore (NUS).

DSI's purpose was to undertake R&D in magnetics technology for hard disk drives (HDDs). Over the years, DSI collaborated with companies such as Seagate, Connor, DEC, Toshiba, Hewlett-Packard and Western Digital.

On 1 June 2018, A*STAR announced its decision to redeploy DSI's renowned capabilities across the organisation in alignment with national research and innovation strategies, and that DSI would no longer function as an independent research unit in A*STAR. The organisation cited the impact of global trends on the data storage industry, resulting in consolidation and much of production happening outside Singapore.

== Awards and accreditations ==
- 2016 IET A F Harvey Engineering Research Prize (Arseniy Kuznetsov)
- 2016 World Scientific Physics Research Award and Gold Medal (Prof Boris Lukiyanchuk)
- 2015 IES Prestigious Engineering Achievement Award 2015 ("ABSolution: Advanced Software Package for Nanometer Spaced Head-Disk Interface Design and Simulation")
- 2014 ISPS 2014 Best Paper award ("Operational Shock Response of Ultrathin Hard Disk Drives")
- 2013 President's Science Award (Prof Boris Luk'yanchuk)
- 2011 Tan Kah Kee Young Inventors' Silver Award ("Enabling Universal Memory through Nanostructure Engineering")
- 2008 Tan Kah Kee Young Inventors' Silver Award ("Breaking the Limits of Phase Change Random Access Memory – The Future Non-Volatile Memory")
- 2006 National Technology Award ("Advanced micro motor technologies used in hard disk drive and miniaturized mechatronic systems")
- 2006 IES Prestigious Engineering Achievement Award ("Nanometer spacing measurement between head and media")
- 2005 INSIC Technical Achievement Award ("Ultra-low flying femto slider for extremely high density magnetic data storage")
- 2005 Tan Kah Kee Young Inventors' Commendation Award ("Nanocluster beam deposition technology for the synthesis of nanostructure materials")
- 2005 National Technology Award ("Ultra-low flying height technology at sub-3nm")
- 2004 Asia Wall Street Journal Young Inventors' Silver Award ("Laser Nanopatterning in the Optical Near-Field for High Density Data Storage")
- 2004 IES Prestigious Engineering Achievement Award ("Advanced Laser Microfabrication and Nanoengineering Technology")
- 2004 Technology Review (TR-100) World's Top 100 Innovators ("Magnetic Random Access Memory {MRAM}")
- 2004 National Technology Award ("Superlattice-like Rewriteable Phase Change Optical Disk")
- 2003 Singapore Innovation Award ("3.5 nm Flying Height Slider for Terabyte Capacity Data Storage")
