= Radar altimeter =

Measures an aircraft's height above the terrain

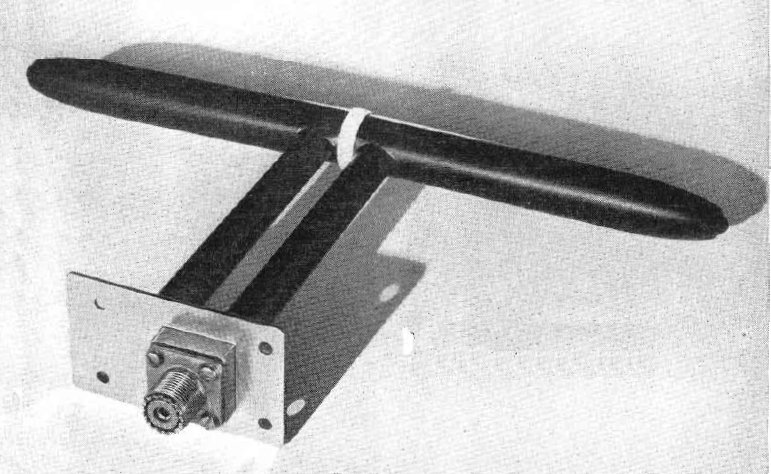
The dipole antenna of a radar altimeter of 1947

A radar altimeter (RA), also called a radio altimeter (RALT), electronic altimeter, reflection altimeter, or low-range radio altimeter (LRRA), measures altitude above the terrain presently beneath an aircraft or spacecraft by timing how long it takes a beam of radio waves to travel to ground, reflect, and return to the craft. This type of altimeter provides the distance between the antenna and the ground directly below it, in contrast to a barometric altimeter which provides the distance above a defined vertical datum, usually mean sea level.

== Principle ==
As the name implies, radar (radio detection and ranging) is the underpinning principle of the system. The system transmits radio waves down to the ground and measures the time it takes them to be reflected back up to the aircraft. The altitude above the ground is calculated from the radio waves' travel time and the speed of light. Radar altimeters required a simple system for measuring the time-of-flight that could be displayed using conventional instruments, as opposed to a cathode ray tube normally used on early radar systems.

To do this, the transmitter sends a frequency modulated signal that changes in frequency over time, ramping up and down between two frequency limits, F_{min} and F_{max} over a given time, T. In the first units, this was accomplished using an LC tank with a tuning capacitor driven by a small electric motor. The output is then mixed with the radio frequency carrier signal and sent out the transmission antenna.

Since the signal takes some time to reach the ground and return, the frequency of the received signal is slightly delayed relative to the signal being sent out at that instant. The difference in these two frequencies can be extracted in a frequency mixer, and because the difference in the two signals is due to the delay reaching the ground and back, the resulting output frequency encodes the altitude. The output is typically on the order of hundreds of cycles per second, not megacycles, and can easily be displayed on analog instruments. This technique is known as Frequency Modulated Continuous-wave radar.

Radar altimeters normally work in the E band, K_{a} band, or, for more advanced sea-level measurement, S band. Radar altimeters also provide a reliable and accurate method of measuring height above water, when flying long sea-tracks. These are critical for use when operating to and from offshore facilities.

The altitude specified by the device is not the indicated altitude of the standard barometric altimeter. A radar altimeter measures absolute altitude: the height "Above Ground Level" (AGL).

As of 2010, all commercial radar altimeters use linear frequency-modulated continuous-wave (LFMCW or FMCW) and about 25,000 aircraft in the US have at least one radio altimeter.

== History ==
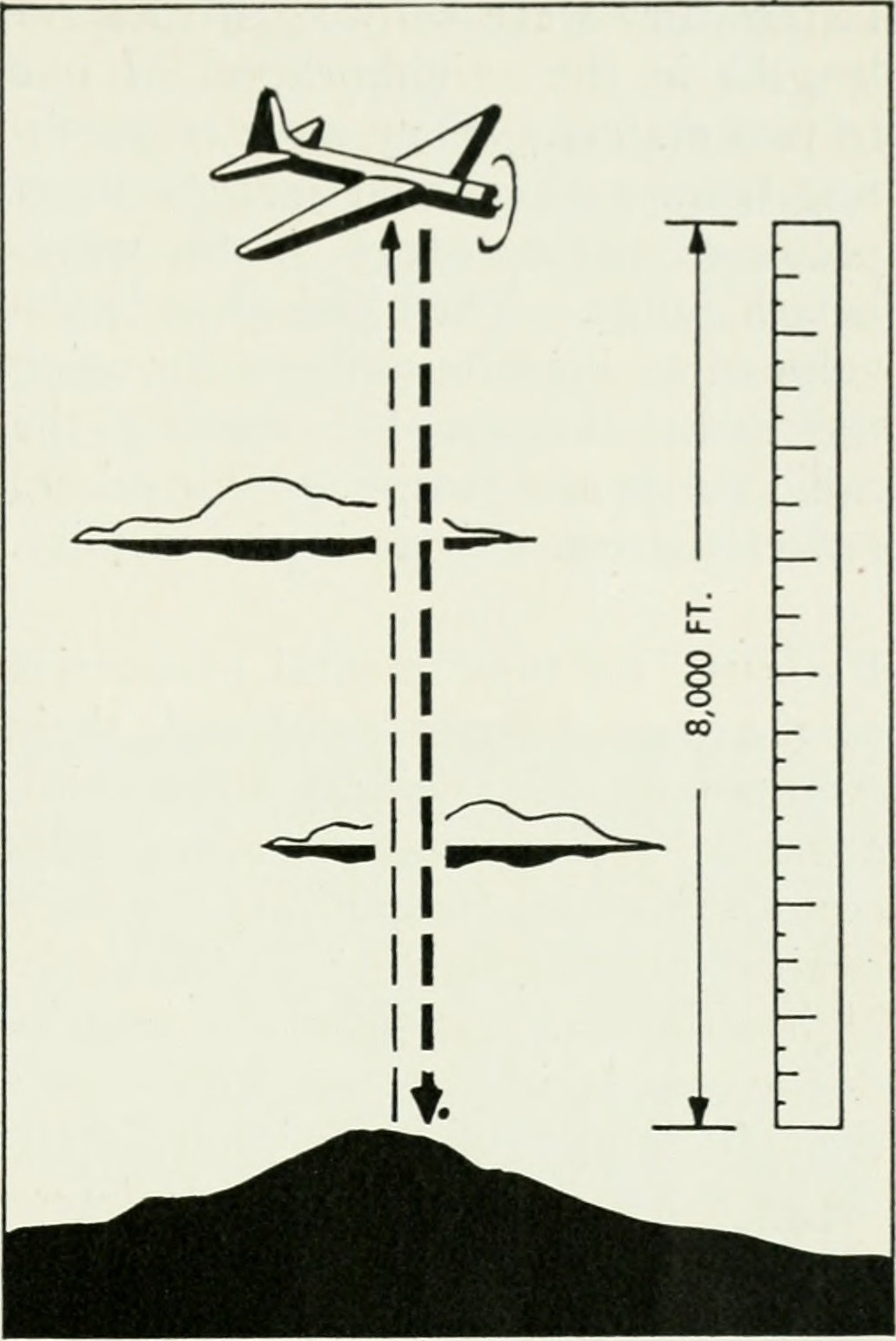
Early diagram of the concept of a radar altimeter, shown in a 1922 Bell Telephone magazine

=== Original concept ===
The underlying concept of the radar altimeter was developed independent of the wider radar field, and originates in a study of long-distance telephony at Bell Labs. During the 1910s, Bell Telephone was struggling with the reflection of signals caused by changes in impedance in telephone lines, typically where equipment connected to the wires. This was especially significant at repeater stations, where poorly matched impedances would reflect large amounts of the signal and made long-distance telephony difficult.

Engineers noticed that the reflections appeared to have a "humpy" pattern to them; for any given signal frequency, the problem would only be significant if the devices were located at specific points in the line. This led to the idea of sending a test signal into the line and then changing its frequency until significant echos were seen. This would reveal the approximate distance to the device, allowing it to be identified and fixed even in lines with many repeater stations along it.

Lloyd Espenschied was working at Bell Labs when he conceived using this same phenomenon to measure distances in a wire. One of his first developments in this field was a 1919 patent (granted 1924) on the idea of sending a signal into railway tracks and measuring the distance to discontinuities. These could be used to detect broken tracks, or if the distance was changing more rapidly than the speed of the train, could warn of the presence of other trains on the same line.

=== Appleton's ionosphere measurements ===
During this same period there was a great debate in physics over the nature of radio propagation. Guglielmo Marconi's successful trans-Atlantic transmissions appeared to be impossible. Studies of radio signals demonstrated they travelled in straight lines, at least over long distances, so the broadcast from Cornwall should have disappeared into space instead of being received in Newfoundland. In 1902, Oliver Heaviside in the UK and Arthur Kennelly in the USA independently postulated the existence of an ionized layer in the upper atmosphere that was bouncing the signal back to the ground so it could be received. This became known as the Heaviside layer.

While an attractive idea, direct evidence was lacking. In 1924, Edward Appleton and Miles Barnett were able to demonstrate the existence of such a layer in a series of experiments carried out in partnership with the BBC. After scheduled transmissions had ended for the day, a BBC transmitter in Bournemouth sent out a signal that slowly increased in frequency. This was picked up by Appleton's receiver in Oxford, where two signals appeared. One was the direct signal from the station, the groundwave, while the other was received later in time after it travelled to the Heaviside layer and back again, the skywave.

Accurately measuring the distance travelled by the skywave, proving it was actually in the sky, was necessary for the demonstration. This was the purpose of the changing frequency. Since the ground signal travelled a shorter distance, it was more recent and thus closer to the frequency being sent at that instant. The skywave, having to travel a longer distance, was delayed, and was thus the frequency as it was some time ago. By mixing the two in a frequency mixer, a third signal is produced that has its own unique frequency that encodes the difference in the two inputs. Since in this case the difference is due to the longer path, the resulting frequency directly reveals the path length. Although technically more challenging, this was ultimately the same basic technique being used by Bell to measure the distance to the reflectors in the wire.

=== Everitt and Newhouse ===
In 1929, William Littell Everitt, a professor at Ohio State University, began considering the use of Appleton's basic technique as the basis for an altimeter system. He assigned the work to two seniors, Russell Conwell Newhouse and M. W. Havel. Their experimental system was more in common with the earlier work at Bell, using changes in frequency to measure the distance to the end of wires. The two used it as the basis for a joint senior thesis in 1929.

Everitt disclosed the concept to the US Patent Office, but did not file a patent at that time. He then approached the Daniel Guggenheim Fund for the Promotion of Aeronautics for development funding. Jimmy Doolittle, secretary of the Foundation, approached Vannevar Bush of Bell Labs to pass judgment. Bush was skeptical that the system could be developed at that time, but nevertheless suggested the Foundation fund development of a working model. This allowed Newhouse to build an experimental machine which formed the basis of his 1930 Master's thesis, in partnership with J. D. Corley.

The device was taken to Wright Field where it was tested by Albert Francis Hegenberger, a noted expert in aircraft navigation. Hegenberger found that the system worked as advertised, but stated that it would have to work at higher frequencies to be practical. (Note: Antennas for radio signals have to be sized to the frequency of the carrier signal. Higher frequency signals use smaller antennas, with many practical advantages for aircraft use.)

=== Espenschied and Newhouse ===
Espenschied had also been considering the use of Appleton's idea for altitude measurement. In 1926 he suggested the idea both as a way to measure altitude as well as a forward-looking system for terrain avoidance and collision detection. However, at that time the frequency of available radio systems even in what was known as shortwave was calculated to be fifty times lower than what would be needed for a practical system.

Espenschied eventually filed a patent on the idea in 1930. By this time, Newhouse had left Ohio State and taken a position at Bell Labs. Here he met Peter Sandretto, who was also interested in radio navigation topics. Sandretto left Bell in 1932 to become the Superintendent of Communications at United Air Lines (UAL), where he led the development of commercial radio systems.

Espenschied's patent was not granted until 1936, and its publication generated intense interest. Around the same time, Bell Labs had been working on new tube designs that were capable of delivering between 5 and 10 Watts at up to 500 MHz, perfect for the role. This led Sandretto to contact Bell about the idea, and in 1937 a partnership between Bell Labs and UAL was formed to build a practical version. Led by Newhouse, a team had a working model in testing in early 1938, and Western Electric (Bell's manufacturing division) was already gearing up for a production model. Newhouse also filed several patents on improvements in technique based on this work.

=== Commercial introduction ===
The system was publicly announced on 8 and 9 October 1938. During World War II, mass production was taken up by RCA, who produced them under the names ABY-1 and RC-24. In the post-war era, many companies took up production and it became a standard instrument on many aircraft as blind landing became commonplace.

A paper describing the system was published jointly by Espenschied and Newhouse the next year. The paper explores sources of error and concludes that the worst-case built-in scenario was on the order of 9%, but this might be as high as 10% when flying over rough terrain like the built-up areas of cities.

During early flights of the system, it was noticed that the pattern of the returns as seen on an oscilloscope was distinct for different types of terrain below the aircraft. This opened the possibility of all sorts of other uses for the same technology, including ground-scanning and navigation. However, these concepts were not able to be explored by Bell at the time.

=== Use as general purpose radar ===
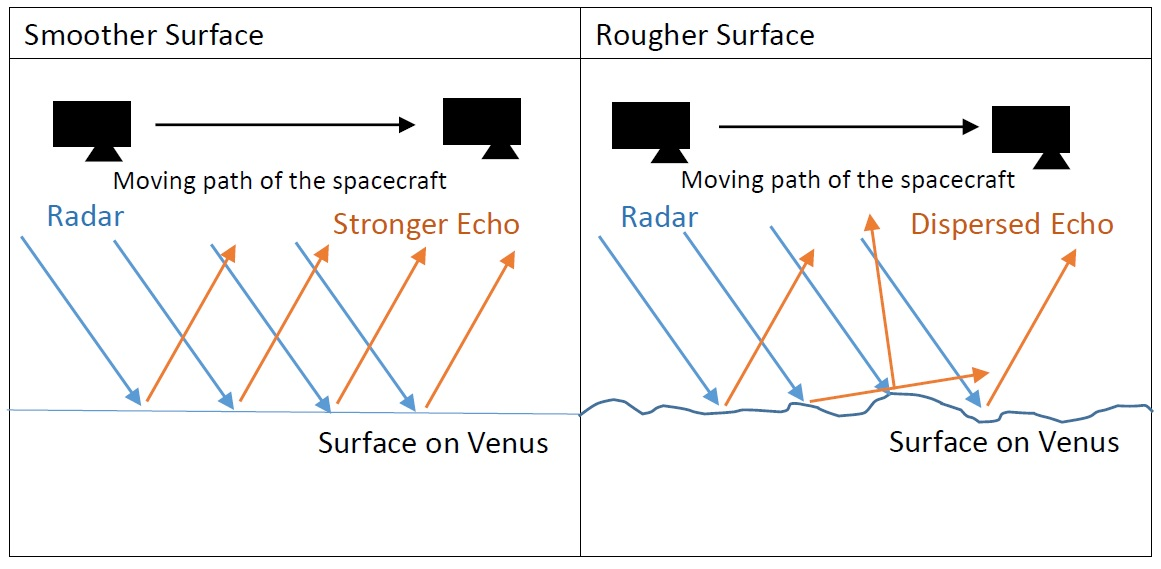
Radar altimeters are used in science, with this diagram showing how a spacecraft could detect surface smoothness on the surface of Venus.

It had been known since the late 1800s that metal and water made excellent reflectors of radio signals, and there had been many attempts to build ship, train and iceberg detectors over the years since that time. Most of these had significant practical limitations due to the use of low-frequency signals that demanded large antennas to provide reasonable performance. The Bell unit, operating at a base frequency of 450 MHz, was among the highest frequency systems of its era which made it much more useful. (Note: Only German units operated in a similar band, other British and US radars of the era worked at around 200 MHz or lower.)

In Canada, the National Research Council (NRC) began working on an airborne radar system using the Bell altimeter as its basis. This came as a great surprise to British researchers when they visited in October 1940 as part of the Tizard Mission, as the British believed at that time that they were the only ones working on the concept. Seeing that the idea was already not a secret, the Mission introduced the NRC to its production quality designs. The Bell-based design was abandoned in favour of building the fully developed British ASV Mark II design, which operated at much higher power levels.

In France, researchers at IT&T's French division were carrying out similar experiments on radar when the German invasion approached the labs in Paris. The labs were deliberately destroyed to prevent the research from falling into German hands. The German teams found the antennas in the rubble and demanded an explanation. The IT&T director of research deflected suspicion by showing them the altimeter unit on the cover of a magazine and admonishing them for not being up-to-date on the latest navigation techniques.

== Applications ==
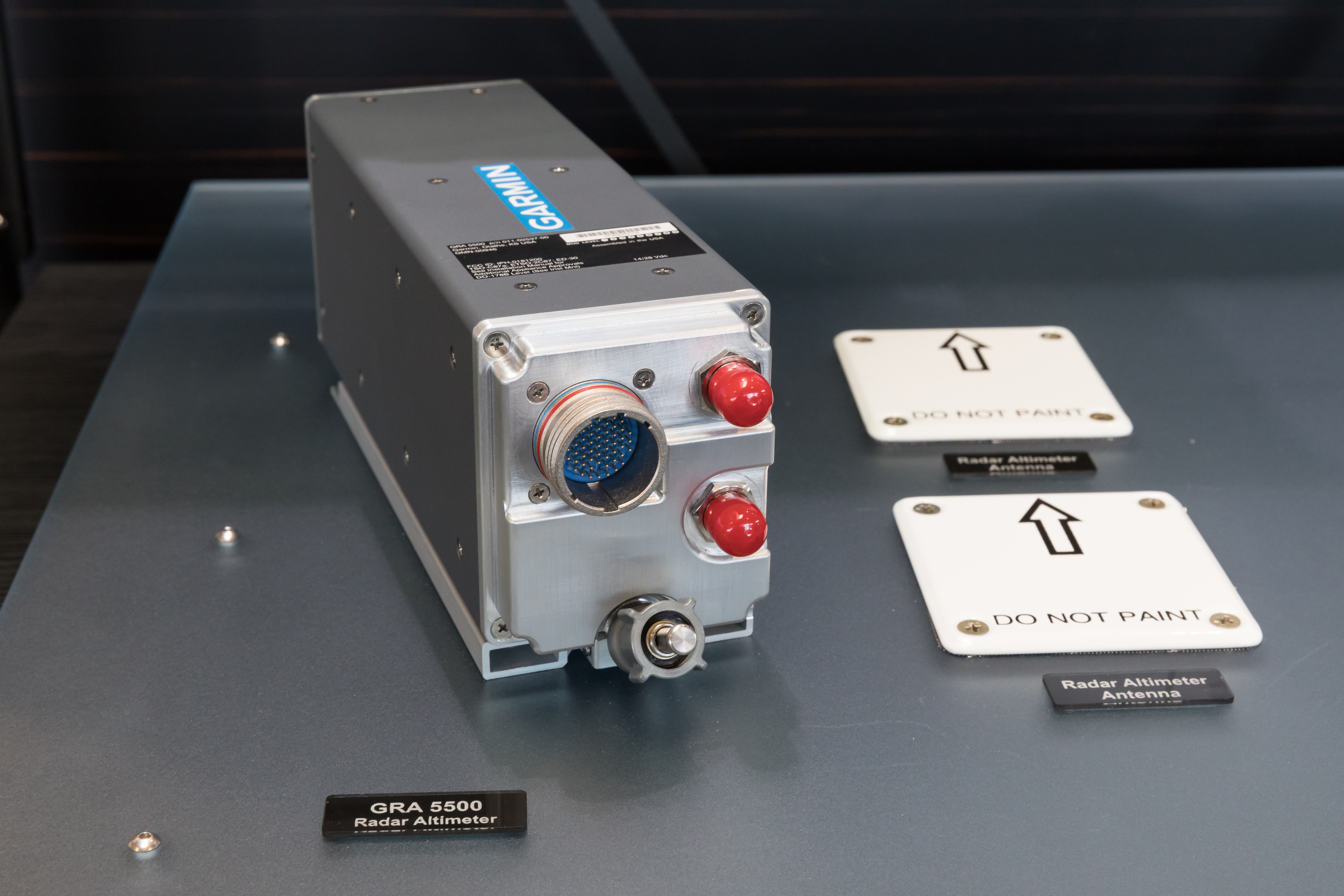
Contemporary radar altimeter equipment in 2018

=== In civil aviation ===
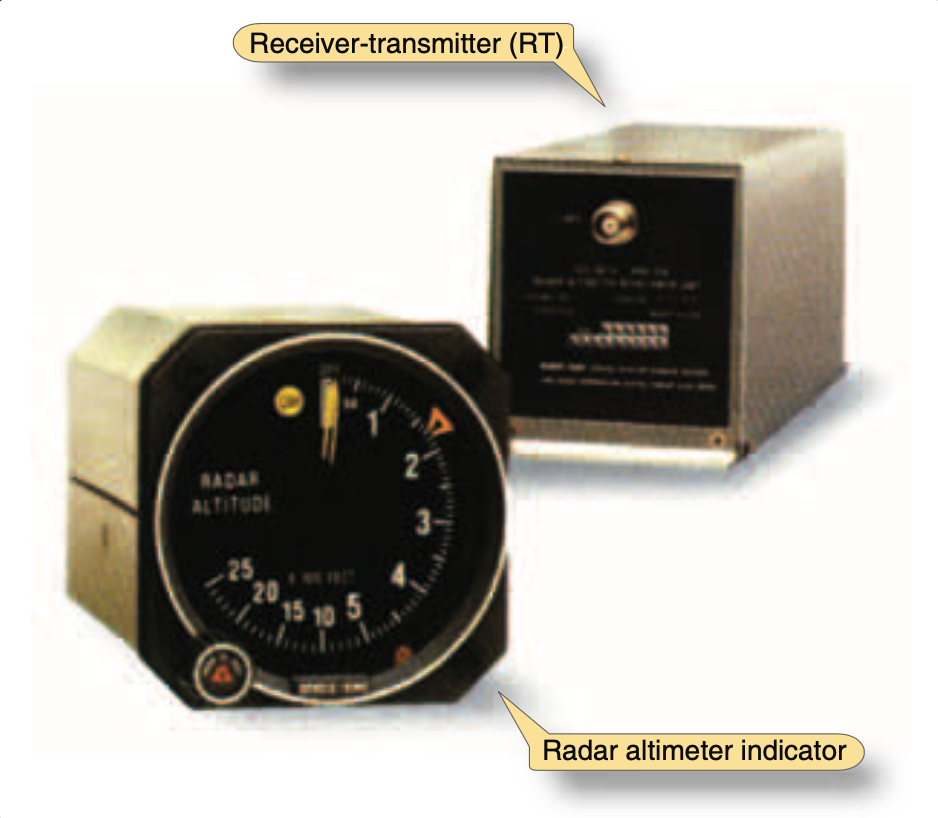
Radar altimeter system includes a receiver-transmitter and a radar altimeter indicator

Radar altimeters are frequently used by commercial aircraft for approach and landing, especially in low-visibility conditions (see instrument flight rules) and automatic landings while they are in the glideslope capture mode below 200–300 ft (61–91 m) above ground level (AGL), allowing the autopilot to know when to begin the flare maneuver. Radar altimeters give data to the autothrottle which is a part of the Flight Computer.

Radar altimeters generally only give readings up to 2,500 feet (760 m) (AGL). Frequently, the weather radar can be directed downwards to give a reading from a longer range, up to 60,000 feet (18,000 m) AGL. As of 2012, all airliners are equipped with at least two and possibly more radar altimeters, as they are essential to autoland capabilities. (As of 2012, determining height through other methods such as GPS is not permitted by regulations.) Older airliners from the 1960s (such as the British Aircraft Corporation BAC 1-11) and smaller airliners in the sub-50 seat class (such as the ATR 42 and BAe Jetstream series) are equipped with them.

Radar altimeters are an essential part in ground proximity warning systems (GPWS), warning the pilot if the aircraft is flying too low or descending too quickly. However, radar altimeters cannot see terrain directly ahead of the aircraft, only that below it; such functionality requires either knowledge of position and the terrain at that position or a forward looking terrain radar. Radar altimeter antennas have a fairly large main lobe of about 80° so that at bank angles up to about 40°, the radar detects the range from the aircraft to the ground (specifically to the nearest large reflecting object). This is because range is calculated based on the first signal return from each sampling period. It does not detect slant range until beyond about 40° of bank or pitch. This is not an issue for landing as pitch and roll do not normally exceed 20°.

Radio altimeters used in civil aviation operate in the IEEE C-band between 4.2 and 4.4 GHz.

In early 2022, potential interference from 5G cell phone towers caused some flight delays and a few flight cancellations in the United States.

=== In military aviation ===
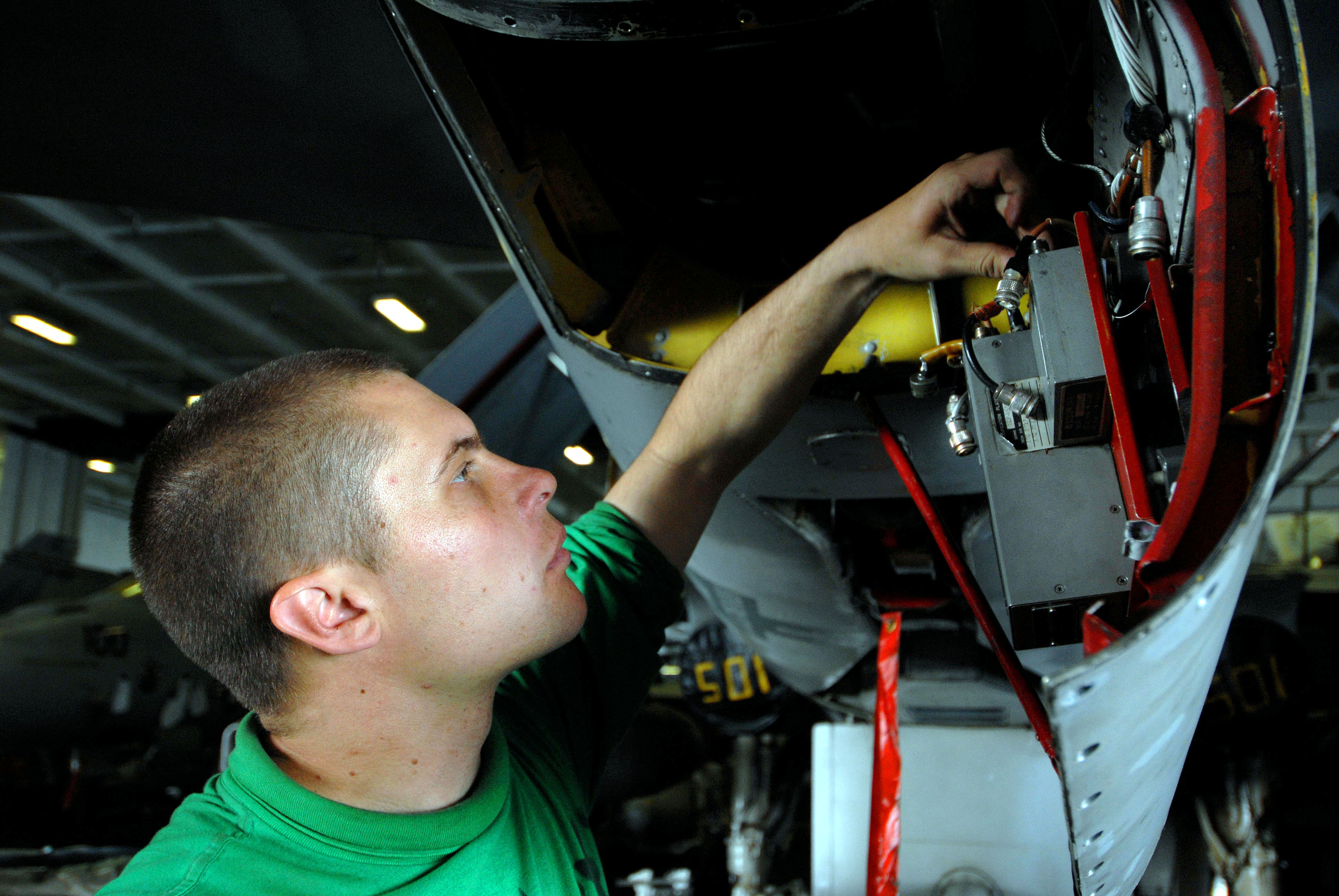
Maintenance being performed on the radar altimeter of a Northrop Grumman EA-6B Prowler

Radar altimeters are also used in military aircraft to fly quite low over the land and the sea to avoid radar detection and targeting by anti-aircraft guns or surface-to-air missiles. A related use of radar altimeter technology is terrain-following radar, which allows fighter bombers to fly at very low altitudes.

The F-111s of the Royal Australian Air Force and the U.S. Air Force have a forward-looking, terrain-following radar (TFR) system connected via digital computer to their automatic pilots. Beneath the nose radome are two separate TFR antennae, each providing individual information to the dual-channel TFR system. In case of a failure in that system, the F-111 has a back-up radar altimeter system, also connected to the automatic pilot. Then, if the F-111 ever dips below the preset minimum altitude (for example, 15 meters) for any reason, its automatic pilot is commanded to put the F-111 into a 2G fly-up (a steep nose-up climb) to avoid crashing into terrain or water. Even in combat, the hazard of a collision is far greater than the danger of being detected by an enemy. Similar systems are used by F/A-18 Super Hornet aircraft operated by Australia and the United States.

== International regulation ==
The International Telecommunication Union (ITU) defines radio altimeters as “radionavigation equipment, on board an aircraft or spacecraft, used to determine the height of the aircraft or the spacecraft above the Earth's surface or another surface" in article 1.108 of the ITU Radio Regulations (RR). Radionavigation equipment shall be classified by the radiocommunication service in which it operates permanently or temporarily. The use of radio altimeter equipment is categorised as a safety-of-life service, must be protected for interferences, and is an essential part of navigation.

== See also ==
- Laser altimeter
- Satellite altimetry
