= Arseniy Kuznetsov =

Optical physicist

Arseniy Kuznetsov is a Russian-born optical physicist.

Kuznetsov is a native of Nizhny Novgorod, born in 1979. His father was a scientist, and his mother an engineer. Both worked for the same research institute in Russia. After graduating from N. I. Lobachevsky State University of Nizhny Novgorod in 2002, Kuznetsov received his first PhD in processes engineering from the University of Paris 13, in 2005, followed by a second PhD in laser physics from the Institute of Applied Physics of the Russian Academy of Sciences in 2006. He received a Humboldt Research Fellowship in 2007, and moved to Germany, where he remained until joining A*STAR's Data Storage Institute in October 2011. While affiliated with the DSI, Kuznetsov won the Institution of Engineering and Technology's A F Harvey Prize in 2016, and specialized in research on nanoplasmonics. In 2021, Kuznetsov was elected a fellow of Optica.
