= Rui L. Reis =

Portuguese scientist (born 1967)

- Rui Luis Gonçalves dos Reis
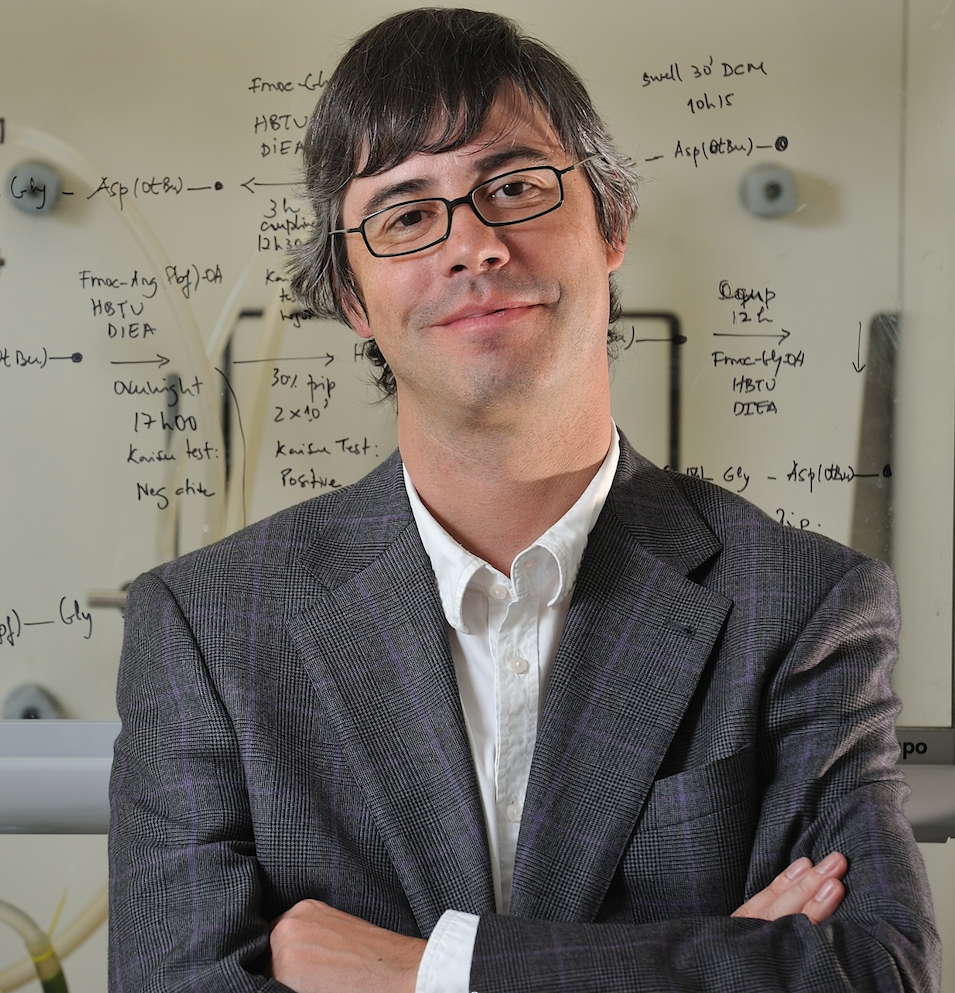
- Born: 19 April 1967 (age 59); Porto, Portugal
- Citizenship: Portugal
- Education: University of Porto and University of Minho, Portugal
- Known for: Biomaterials, tissue engineering, regenerative medicine, controlled drug delivery, biomimetics, biodegradable polymers, natural origin materials, marine based resources, cork based materials
- Spouse: Olga Paiva
- Children: Bernardo Luis Reis
- Website: www.3bs.uminho.pt

Rui Luís Reis (born 19 April 1967) is a Portuguese scientist known for his research in tissue engineering, regenerative medicine, biomaterials, biomimetics, stem cells, and biodegradable polymers.

Reis is a professor of at the University of Minho in Braga and Guimarães. He is the Founding Director of the 3B's Research Group, part of the Research Institute on Biomaterials, Biodegradables and Biomimetics (I3Bs) of UMinho (www.i3bs.uminho.pt), a group that specializes in the areas of Regenerative Medicine, Tissue Engineering, Stem Cells and Biomaterials. He is also the Director of the ICVS/3B's Associate Laboratory of UMinho. He is the CEO of the European Institute of Excellence on Tissue Engineering and Regenerative Medicine. Rui L. Reis was, from 2013 to 2017, the Vice-Rector (vice-president) for research and innovation of UMinho. From 2007 to 2021 Reis was the editor-in-chief of the Journal of Tissue Engineering and Regenerative Medicine. From 2016 to 2018, he was president of the Tissue Engineering and Regenerative Medicine International Society (TERMIS).

Reis is in the board of several scientific societies, companies and associations. From 2017 to 2019, he was the President of TECMINHO - the technology transfer office of the University of Minho. Reis is the CEO of the European Institute of Excellence on Tissue Engineering and Regenerative Medicine in Avepark, Guimarães.

He co-founded different start up companies originating from the research and activities of 3B's research group, such as Stemmatters and HydruStent/HydruMedical.

Reis is the current president of the I3B's research institute, and one of the most cited Portuguese researchers in science.

== Biography ==
Reis was born and has always lived in Porto, being one of three children of a chemical engineering professor and a domestic. Reis spent a small part of his childhood in Metangula, Mozambique, a small town near Lake Niassa, while his father was engaged in military service during the Portuguese Colonial War. He is married with Olga Paiva and has one son, Bernardo Reis (born in 2001). He is a strong supporter of FC Porto.

Reis graduated in Metallurgical Engineering, University of Porto, Portugal, in 1990. He then completed a master's degree at the University of Porto, Portugal, in 1994. Reis did his PhD on Polymer Engineering – Biomaterials, Regenerative Medicine & Tissue Engineering, in the University of Minho, Portugal and Brunel University London, in 1999. He also completed a Doctor of Science (D.Sc.) degree on Biomedical Engineering - Biomaterials & Tissue Engineering, by University of Minho, Portugal, in 2007. Reis has also received two Honoris Causa degrees: A first in Medicine from University of Granada, Spain, in 2010 and a second in Engineering from University Polytechnica of Bucharest, Romania, in 2018.

== Career ==
Reis is a researcher who has been involved in the field of biomaterials since 1990. He has worked with several universities and companies abroad.

Some of Reis' research has been on liver and neurological tissues regeneration, new strategies for antimicrobial materials, innovative high-throughput approaches for studying cell/materials interactions, as well as on TE approaches for developing different 3D disease models, including different cancer models, and therapies for treatment of diabetes and Alzheimers.

Reis has also been responsible for several cooperation programs with universities and companies worldwide. He has coordinated four major EU research projects, including the STREP "HIPPOCRATES".

Under HORIZON 2020, Reis was the coordinator of the ERA Chairs FoReCast grant for 3B's-UMinho. He has coordinated two TWINNING projects Gene2Skin and Chem2Nature, and is currently coordinating another TWINNING project. Until 2021, he was the coordinator of the 15 MEuros EC funded TEAMING proposal, "The Discoveries Centre for Regenerative and Precision Medicine" with UCL - University College London, UPorto, UAveiro, ULisboa, and UNova Lisboa. He is also the PI of a major project of the Portuguese roadmap for strategic infrastructures, TERM Research Hub.

== Honours and awards ==
- 2002: Jean LeRay Award by the European Society for Biomaterials for outstanding contributions to the biomaterials field as a young scientist
- 2007: Pfizer Award for Clinical Research
- 2007: START Innovation Award
- 2011: George Winter Award by the European Society for Biomaterials
- 2011: Gold Medal of Scientific Merit from the City of Guimarães
- 2014: Clemson Award for Contributions to the Literature by the Society for Biomaterials (SFB, USA)
- 2014: Nomination as a Commander (Comendador, a kind of knighthood) of the Military Order of Saint James of the Sword by the Portuguese President of the Republic
- 2015: International Fellow of Tissue Engineering of Regenerative Medicine (FTERM), Boston
- 2016: Induction as a foreigner member of the National Academy of Engineering (NAE) of the USA
- 2018: IET A F Harvey Prize – Institute of Engineering and Technology
- 2018: Induction as Fellow of the European Alliance for Medical and Biological Engineering and Science (EAMBES)
- 2018: UNESCO-Equatorial Guinea International Prize for Research in the Life Sciences
- 2018: Induction as Fellow of the American Institute for Medical and Biological Engineering (AIMBE)
- 2018: Honoris Causa degree awarded by the University Politechnica of Bucharest (UPB)
- 2019: Career Achievement Award of the Tissue Engineering and Regenerative Medicine International Society, TERMIS-EU
- 2020: Gold Medal of the City of Braga
- 2022: Klaas de Groot Award by the European Society for Biomaterials
