= Mario Silveirinha =

Mário G. Silveirinha
- Born: Coimbra, Portugal
- Known for: Metamaterials, plasmonics, nanophotonics
- Awards: IET A F Harvey Prize
- Scientific career
- Fields: Physics, Electrical Engineering
- Workplaces: University of Lisbon (2015-Present), University of Coimbra (1998-2015), Instituto de Telecomunicações (1998-Present)

Mário G. Silveirinha is a professor of electrical engineering at Instituto Superior Técnico - University of Lisbon, and a senior researcher at Instituto de Telecomunicações, in Portugal.

He was named Fellow of the Institute of Electrical and Electronics Engineers (IEEE) in 2015 for contributions to electrodynamics of metamaterials. He was chosen as the 2018 recipient of the IET Harvey Engineering Research Prize for his outstanding contributions to research in the field of Radar and Microwave Engineering, specifically in the electrodynamics of metamaterials and its applications to microwave components and devices. In 2020, his research achievements earned him a Fellowship from The Optical Society (OSA) and the American Physical Society (APS), for pioneering and seminal contributions to the theory of metamaterials and plasmonics. He is a member of the Academy of Sciences of Lisbon.

Mário Silveirinha has co-authored over 200 journal articles, 6 book chapters, and co-edited two journal special issues.
