= Hugh Duncan Griffiths =

British engineer

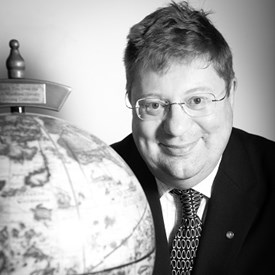
- Born: Bournemouth, United Kingdom
- Education: Keble College, Oxford University
- Awards: IEEE AES Nathanson Award (1996, 2014, 2019) IET A F Harvey Prize (2012) IEEE Dennis J. Picard Medal for Radar Technologies and Applications (2017); IET Achievement Medal (2018) OBE (2019)

Hugh Duncan Griffiths is a British electronic engineer. He is known for his contributions in radar research, especially in bistatic radar and passive radar for which he has received many awards and prizes. He was appointed as an Officer of the Order of the British Empire for services to engineering in 2019.

== Career and research ==
Griffiths received the BA degree in Physics from Keble College, Oxford University in 1975 (MA Physics 1978), then spent three years working in industry, before joining the Department of Electronic and Electrical Engineering at University College London, where he received the PhD degree in 1986 and the DSc(Eng) degree in 2000 for published work on radar and sonar. He was Head of Department from 2001 to 2006 and then Principal of the Defence College of Management and Technology at Shrivenham from 2006 to 2008.

Since 2009 Griffiths holds the THALES/Royal Academy Chair of RF Sensors in the Department of Electronic and Electrical Engineering at University College London, England.

He has published over 550 research papers in journals and conference proceedings. Books include Modern Antennas (Springer, 2005), Advances in Bistatic Radar (Scitech, 2007), Radar Automatic Target Recognition and Non-Cooperative Target Recognition (IET, 2013), An Introduction to Passive Radar (Artech House, 2017 – also published in Chinese, second edition 2022).

- Since 1982 he has served as Editor-in-Chief of the IET Radar, Sonar and Navigation journal.
- In 2003 he was elected Freeman of the City of London and Liveryman of the Worshipful Company of Engineers.
- In 2017 he was appointed Chair of the Defence Science Expert Committee (DSEC) in the UK Ministry of Defence.
- He is a member of the Home Office Science Advisory Council (HOSAC).

== Awards and honours ==
- 1994: elected FIOA (Institute of Acoustics).
- 1995: elected FIEE (now FIET).
- 1996: IEEE AES Nathanson Award ‘for advancement of radar, remote sensing, antenna technology, and radar education’.
- 1997: Elected Fellow of the Royal Academy of Engineering.
- 1999: elected FIEEE ‘for contributions to synthetic aperture radar (SAR), interferometric SAR, and sonar’.
- 2012: IET A F Harvey Prize.
- 2013: IEEE Mimno award.
- 2014: IEEE AES Nathanson Award ‘for advancement of radar, remote sensing, antenna technology, and radar education’.
- 2017: IEEE Dennis J. Picard Medal for Radar Technologies and Applications ‘for technology leadership and exceptional contributions to multistatic radar’.
- 2017: IET Achievement Medal for Radar Engineering.
- 2019: appointed OBE for services to engineering.
- 2019: IEEE AES Nathanson Award ‘for advancement of radar, remote sensing, antenna technology, and radar education’.
- 2021: elected Fellow of the Royal Society.
