= Moeness Amin =

Egyptian-American professor and engineer

Moeness G. Amin
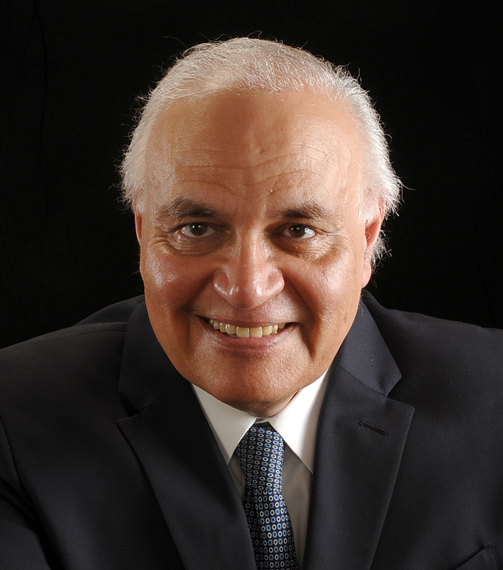
- Born: 1955 (age 70–71); Cairo, Egypt
- Education: University of Colorado, Boulder
- Scientific career
- Fields: Signal Processing, Radar, Satellite Navigation
- Workplaces: Villanova University

Moeness G. Amin (Arabic: أحمد مؤنس أمين; born 1955) is an Egyptian-American electrical engineer and professor known for pioneering contributions to signal processing, radar imaging, and integrated sensing and communications. He is Director of the Center for Advanced Communications and Professor of Electrical and Computer Engineering at Villanova University in Pennsylvania. Amin is recognized internationally for advancing wireless communications and radar technologies for several civilian applications and defense, and for leadership in signal processing research spanning four decades.

== Early life and education ==
Amin was born and raised in Cairo, Egypt. He earned a Bachelor of Science in electrical engineering from Cairo University in 1976. After teaching there for a year, he obtained a Master of Science in electrical engineering from King Fahd University of Petroleum and Minerals in 1980. He later completed a Ph.D. in electrical engineering at the University of Colorado Boulder in 1984.

== Academic career ==
Amin began his academic career as an assistant professor at the University of Colorado Denver in 1984. In 1985, he joined the Department of Electrical and Computer Engineering at Villanova University, where he became a tenured associate professor in 1988 and full professor in 1994. In 2002, he was appointed Director of the Center for Advanced Communications (CAC), a multidisciplinary research hub focused on wireless and radar systems, covering the areas of innovative antenna design, microwave technologies, signal analysis and processing, and machine learning.

Under his direction, the CAC has secured more than US$25 million in external research funding from different US government research agencies, including the National Science Foundation (NSF), Office of Naval Research (ONR), Defense Advanced Research Projects Agency (DARPA), Army Research Laboratory, and Air Force Research Laboratory, as well as from industrial partners including Boeing, Comcast, and General Electric. Amin has supervised more than 30 doctoral students and postdoctoral researchers and has taught courses in digital signal processing, radar systems, adaptive filtering, and wireless communications.

Amin has also held international appointments, including as a Humboldt Research Award Fellow and visiting professor at Technische Universität Darmstadt from 2016 to 2019, and as the Fulbright Distinguished Chair in Advanced Science and Technology in Australia in 2017.

== Research and contributions ==
=== Through-the-wall and indoor radar imaging ===
Amin is regarded as a leading figure in through-the-wall radar imaging (TWRI), developing algorithms and imaging techniques capable of detecting and tracking targets through opaque barriers. His research introduced methods for high-resolution radar imaging without prior knowledge of wall characteristics, improved motion parameter estimation, and exploitation of multipath reflections. His edited volume Through-the-Wall Radar Imaging (CRC Press, 2011) became a standard reference in the field.

=== Radar for healthcare and human monitoring ===
Amin has led pioneering research in applying radar sensing to civilian healthcare, particularly for elderly care and assisted living. His studies on RF-based human activity recognition have resulted in non-contact monitoring systems for fall detection, gait analysis, and respiratory pattern recognition. He introduced radar-based methods for gesture and motion recognition, combining traditional signal processing with deep learning. His work in this area has been featured in The Wall Street Journal, The Atlantic, The Verge, and PBS Nova.

=== Integrated sensing and communications ===
Amin is a pioneer of dual-function radar-communications (DFRC) systems that integrate sensing and data transmission using shared radio resources and transceiver platforms. His contributions include joint performance optimization using available temporal, spectral and spatial degrees of freedom, developing new signaling methods for embedding communications within radar system level and signal processing-level parameters and establishing frameworks for spectrum coexistence, precursors to emerging 6G integrated sensing and communications (ISAC) technologies.

=== Sparse arrays and compressive sensing ===
Amin has made significant theoretical and applied advances in sparse array design, optimizing array configuration for beamforming and direction-finding in radar systems. He introduced generalized coprime configurations and multi-frequency processing techniques that enhance system resolution using fewer antennas. His 2023 edited book Sparse Arrays for Radar, Sonar, and Communications (Wiley-IEEE Press) consolidates these developments.

In compressive sensing, Amin formulated algorithms for imaging and detection using incomplete radar data, developing techniques to mitigate ghost artifacts and improve urban radar performance. His edited book Compressive Sensing for Urban Radar (CRC Press, 2014) was among the first to bridge compressive sensing theory with practical urban radar applications.

=== Satellite navigation and interference mitigation ===
Amin’s work in satellite-based navigation includes innovations in anti-jamming and interference mitigation for GPS receivers. He developed multi-antenna, subspace projection, and time-frequency techniques for interference suppression and performance enhancement in multipath and non-Gaussian noise environments, strengthening the resilience of global navigation satellite systems.

== Publications and editorial work ==
Amin has authored over 900 journal articles, conference papers, and book chapters. His research output has been cited widely in radar and signal processing literature.

He is the editor of four major reference works:

- Through-the-Wall Radar Imaging (CRC Press, 2011)
- Compressive Sensing for Urban Radar (CRC Press, 2014)
- Radar for Indoor Monitoring: Detection, Classification, and Assessment (CRC Press, 2017)
- Sparse Arrays for Radar, Sonar, and Communications (Wiley-IEEE Press, 2023)

Amin has served on editorial boards for the IEEE Signal Processing Magazine, EURASIP Signal Processing Journal, and Proceedings of the IEEE, and is currently a member of the Board of IEEE Press. He has guest-edited numerous special issues in leading journals, including Proceedings of the IEEE, IEEE Transactions on Geoscience and Remote Sensing, IEEE Journal on Selected Topics in Signal Processing and Digital Signal Processing Journal.

== Recognition ==
In 2000, Amin was awarded the Third Millennium Medal from IEEE, and was named a Distinguished Lecturer by the IEEE Signal Processing Society between 2003 and 2004. In 2009, he received the Technical Achievement Award from EURASIP. In 2014, Amin received the Technical Achievement Award from IEEE Signal Processing Society. He then received the Excellence in Radar Engineering, Warren D. White Award from IEEE Aerospace and Electronic Systems Society in 2015, and both the Alexander von Humboldt Research Award and IET Achievement Medal in 2016.

Amin received the 2009 Best Paper Award from IEEE Transactions on Signal Processing and the 2016 Premium Paper Award, IET Radar, Sonar & Navigation In 2017, he received both the Harry Rowe Mimno Paper Award from the IEEE Aerospace and Electronic Systems Magazine and the EURASIP Best Paper Award for Signal Processing (EURISIP-ELSEVIER). In 2018 and 2023, he received the M. Barry Carlton Paper Award from the IEEE Transactions on Aerospace and Electronic Systems. His work in radar and its applications to health monitoring and through wall imaging was recognized with receiving the 2022 IEEE Dennis J. Picard Gold Medal in Radar Technologies and Applications.

Amin is a Life Fellow of the IEEE, Fellow of the SPIE, Fellow of the EURASIP, and Fellow of IET.

== Professional service ==
Amin has held numerous leadership roles in professional societies. He chaired the IEEE Philadelphia Section Signal Processing Chapter (1990–1995) and served on the IEEE Technical Committees on Statistical Signal and Array Processing and Signal Processing for Communications. He was a member of the Franklin Institute Committee on Science and the Arts (2001–2016), leading and participating in the selection of recipients of the Franklin Medal.

He has chaired or co-chaired major conferences, including the IEEE International Symposium on Time-Frequency and Time-Scale Analysis (1994) and the IEEE Statistical Signal and Array Processing Workshop (2000), and delivered more than 20 plenary and keynote lectures at international symposia worldwide.
