= John C. Travers =

British physicist

John C. Travers FRSE is a British optical physicist.

Travers graduated from Durham University in 2003 with a M.Sci degree in mathematics and physics. He subsequently completed a M.Sc. (2004) and Ph.D. (2008) at Imperial College London. Travers stayed at Imperial as a postdoc until 2010, then joined the Max Planck Institute for the Science of Light in Germany.

In 2016, Travers established the Laboratory of Ultrafast Physics and Optics at Heriot-Watt University, and was promoted to full professor in 2019. He was the 2022 recipient of the Institution of Engineering and Technology's A F Harvey Prize. In 2024, Travers was awarded a Royal Academy of Engineering Chair in Emerging Technologies.
