= John Travers (priest) =

Irish Anglican priest

John Travers, D.D. was Archdeacon of Armagh from May to November 1693.

Travers held the livings at Drumglass and Killyman from 1690 to 1693; was Vicar of St Andrew, Dublin from 1693; Prebendary of Tassaggart in St Patrick's Cathedral, Dublin from 1699 to 1607; Chancellor of Christ Church Cathedral, Dublin from 1699; and Prebendary of Monmohenock at St Patrick's from 1707. He died on 17 September 1727.
