= Merrill Skolnik =

Radar researcher

Merrill I Skolnik
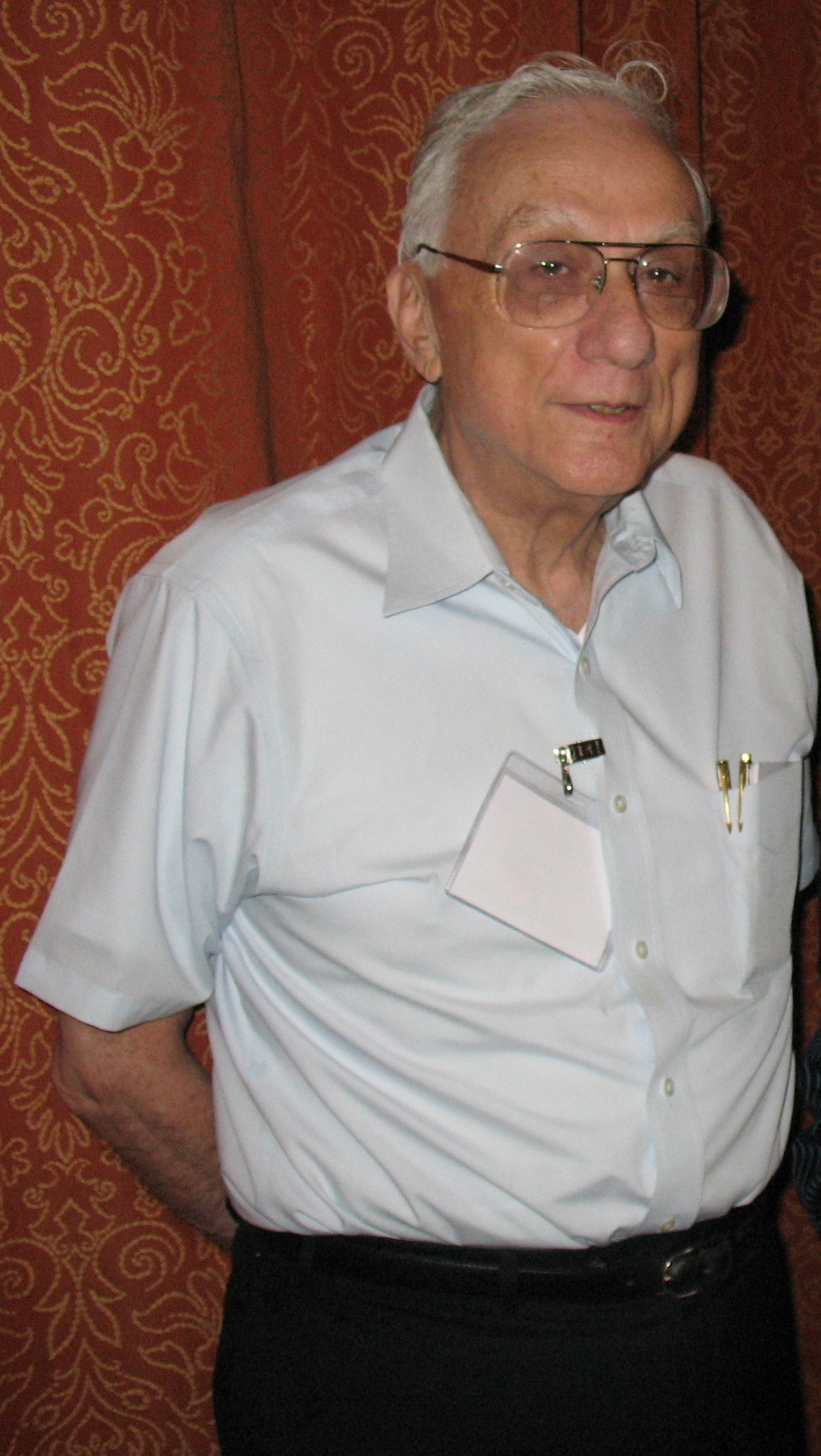
- Born: November 6, 1927; Baltimore, MD
- Died: January 27, 2022 (aged 94)
- Education: Johns Hopkins University
- Spouse: Judith M Skolnik
- Children: Nachama, Martin, Julia, Ellen

Merrill Skolnik (November 6, 1927 – January 27, 2022) was an American researcher in the area of radar systems and the author or editor of a number of standard texts in the field. He is best known for his introductory text "Introduction to Radar Systems" and for editing the "Radar Handbook".

From 1965 to his retirement in 1996, he worked for the Naval Research Laboratory (NRL) in the US. Earlier in his career, he worked with the Institute for Defense Analyses, MIT Lincoln Laboratory, and the Johns Hopkins Radiation Laboratory, among other organizations. He is a Fellow of the IEEE and was editor of the Proceedings of the IEEE. In 2000, he was the first recipient of the IEEE Dennis J. Picard Medal for Radar Technologies and Applications. In 1986, he was elected a member of the National Academy of Engineering for contributions to the advancement of radar, and for leadership in radar engineering research and development.
