= Kolster Radio Corporation =

American electronics company

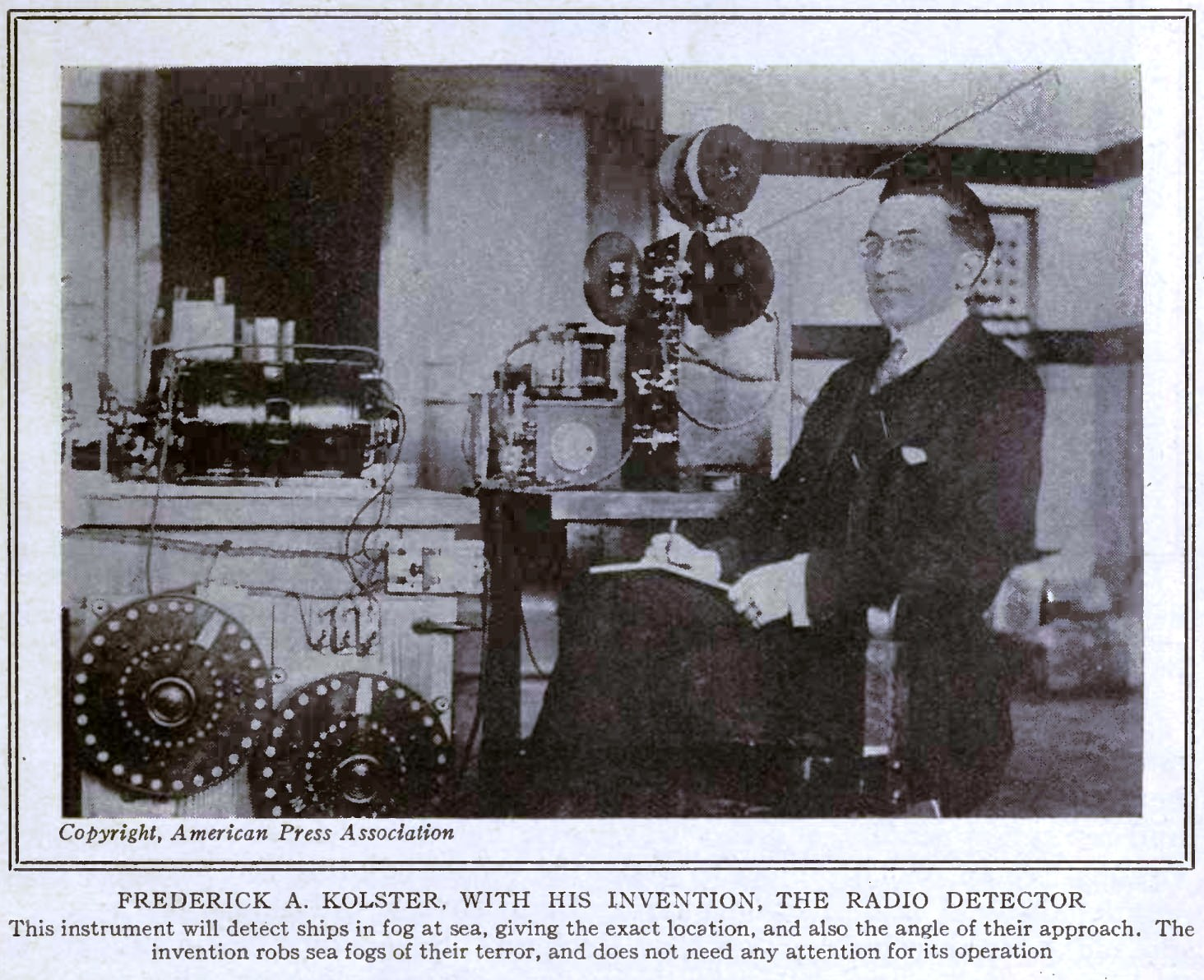
Frederick A. Kolster, 1915

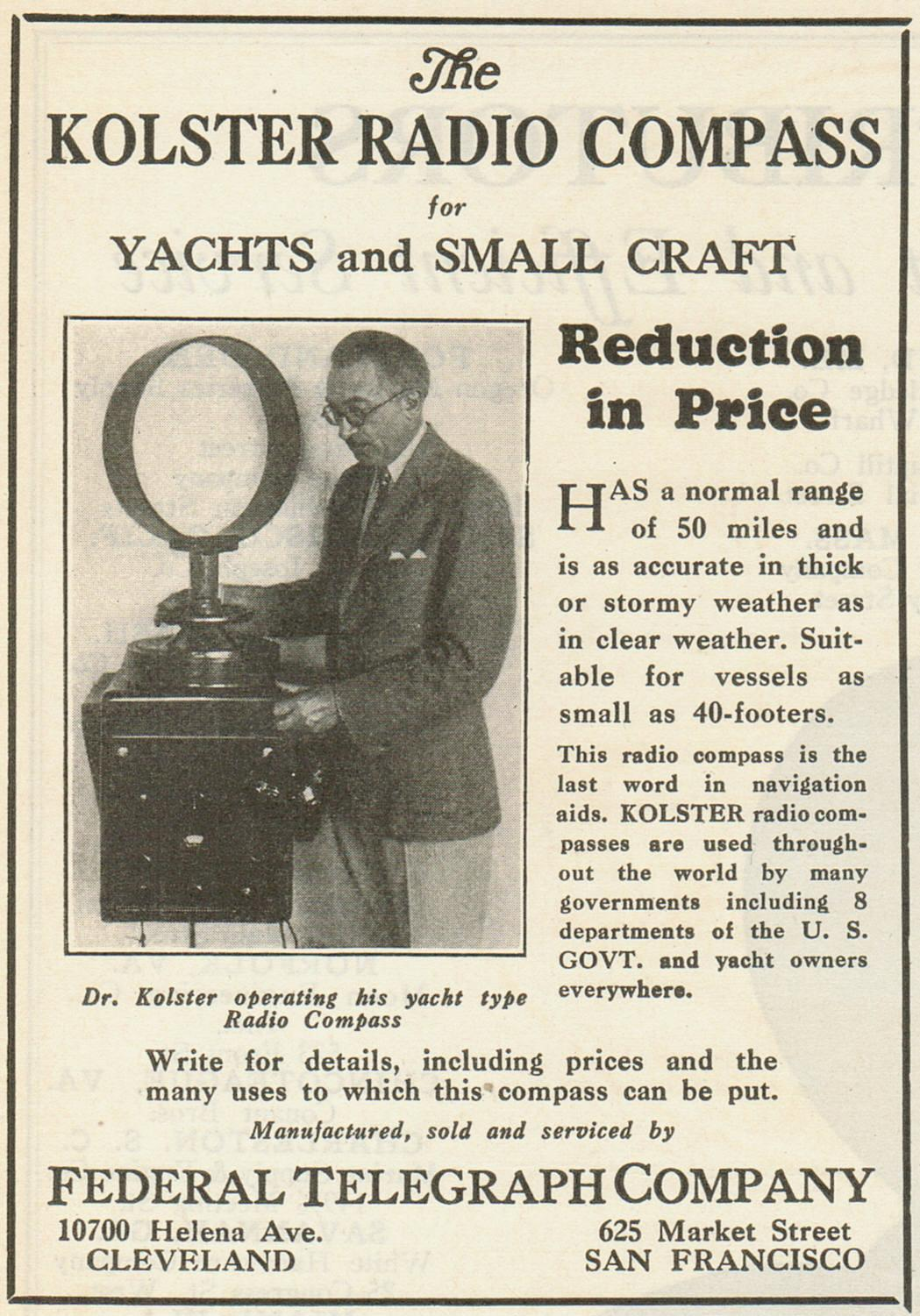
Advertisement for radio compass

The Kolster Radio Corporation was an electronics manufacturer and distributor based in Newark, New Jersey, which went bankrupt in January 1930. Its origins were in the merger of the Federal Telegraph Company and the Brandes Production Corporation in 1926, which led to the creation of a new holding company called Federal-Brandes Inc. It assumed the name of Kolster Radio Corporation in April 1928, been based on the name of the radio receivers designed by its chief research engineer, Frederick A. Kolster. In June 1928, the Columbia Phonograph Company announced plans to market a radio receiving set built by Kolster Radio. The product was sold in the United States, Europe, and Japan.

== Insolvency ==
Three receivers were appointed on January 21, 1930, to handle the failure of the company, which was located at 200 Mount Prospect Avenue in Newark. The business possessed considerably more assets than liabilities. However, because of overproduction, it suffered an inability to raise cash to fulfill its immediate obligations.

Under a plan approved by receivers, the Kolster plant in Newark reopened after March 1930. The production facility fulfilled the completion of 15,000 partly built radio sets. These were sold to Kolster distributors for US$500,000.
