= Institute for Strategy and Reconciliation =

- Founded: 1998; Washington, D.C., United States
- Type: Non-governmental organization Think-tank
- Purpose: Humanitarian aid, education, reconciliation
- Location: Washington, D.C., United States (international)
- Region served: DPRK
- Method: Service, research
- Key people: Asaph Young Chun, Founding President and Chairman; Rhee Syngman, International Chairman; Chan-Mo Park, Honorary Chairman
- Website: www.isr2020.org

The Institute for Strategy and Reconciliation (ISR, also known as The International Strategy and Reconciliation Foundation, Incorporated) is an independent, non-profit 501(c)(3) international institution approved by the US Department of Treasury. Its chapter, the ISR-Korea, has been approved by the Ministry of Unification of South Korea. As a think tank and international development and relief organization headquartered in Washington DC, the ISR conducts evidence-based humanitarian projects and interdisciplinary research and studies, including science diplomacy, to support development programs. The ISR carries out research projects in the fields of science, education, and public health that are devoted to helping and saving the disadvantaged people. The ISR addresses policy challenges promoting international and national reconciliation, and facilitates conflict resolution in hard-to-engage regions in collaboration with academic and non-governmental programs.

== Legal Structure and Finance ==
The ISR's organizational structure consists of a board of trustees and an advisory council. The Board of Trustees consists of prominent leaders in the United States and across the Atlantic. The ISR's research programs and management are implemented by fully abiding the U.S laws and being transparent to the public. The Institute's operating budget is provided primarily by corporate and individual donors and supported by grants and endowments. The institute's annual finance report is audited by a Certified Public Accountant.

== Program Objectives ==
The ISR's program focus is on conducting the development and humanitarian programs as well as the associated public policy research and studies. The humanitarian and development research includes research of relief and sustainable development, public health, and education in humanitarian crisis regions in DPRK, Asia and Europe. The public policy research includes but is not limited to: science diplomacy via a vehicle of higher education, facilitation of humanitarian policy education programs in academia and think tanks to nurture emerging leaders of science diplomacy, and research of American educational resources to help meet students' needs to grow as humanitarian leaders in the 21st century. Other programs meeting the mission of the ISR are considered.

== Major Activities ==
The ISR has been dedicated to improving quality of life of people of DPRK by supporting steady improvement of the health and education system in DPRK, on humanitarian ground, by providing innovative support and humanitarian aid, hosting public forums on reconciliation, and carrying out interdisciplinary research projects.

=== Medical and Health Programs in DPR Korea ===
ISR has sent since 1998 over $36 million value of essential medicines and medical supplies in scores of shipments to DPR Korea. Its target beneficiaries are children, elderly, pregnant/nursing women, and the disabled. The ISR "Reconciliation Ambassadors with Medicines" (RAMs) have made periodic visits to DPR Korea to observe beneficiaries of medical distribution, and assess the nation's needs for sustainable health and effective education. Reports have been periodically documented in the UN relief web.

Reconciliation Child Project is the ISR project focusing on caring for the health needs of emaciated children and pregnant/nursing women of DPR Korea. Since its initial medical aid to the DPRK in 1998, ISR RAMs have periodically visited the DPRK to verify drugs are distributed to the intended target beneficiaries of DPRK as well as assess medical needs for the future support. DPR Korea Ministry of Public Health and medical doctors have expressed heart-felt gratitude for the efforts by ISR teams. The ISR's Founding President and Chairman Dr. Asaph Young Chun indicated, "The ISR's RAMs are servants who are planting seeds of reconciliation by providing essential medical aid." Such years of effort have been paid off when the ISR's medical aid has been found to reach all of DPRK provinces for saving and treating patients in provincial and local hospitals and clinics. It has been known that the medicines donated by Korean-Americans opened reconciliation gates between people of the DPRK and the United States.

Project Reconciliation for the Disabled is an ISR project launched for the purpose of sending wheelchairs and crutches and manufacturing prosthetic limbs for the disabled children and adults of DPRK. The institute appealed in the fall of 1999 to send such medical equipment to the disabled of DPRK. In response to this appeal, the America Wheat Mission, Inc., among others, kicked off a national campaign in March 2000 to help send 150 wheel chairs and 500 crutches. The ISR became the first and only American NGO to manufacture prosthetic limbs in DPRK in 2007. The ISR has sent by today over 600 wheel chairs and 12,000 crutches and helped custom-manufacture over 250 prosthetic limbs in country for the disabled children and adults, including their rehabilitation.

=== Research and Studies ===
ISR has presented since 1998 a number of briefings of DPR Korea issues and policy options to governmental and nongovernmental institutions, UN agencies, the NGO community, and international gatherings of stakeholders to help improve engagement between DPRK and the international community. Audience of ISR briefings included US Department of State, US Agency for International Development, House International Relations Committee, Senate Foreign Relations Committee, and European Union among others. ISR also conducts interdisciplinary research on various topics of public interest, such as research on separated families and forecasting the results of American and Korean elections – presidential and midterm elections.

The first-ever survey estimate of ethnic Korean-Americans with their families left in DPRK: In 2007, the ISR Founding President and the chief research scientist, Dr. Asaph Young Chun reported that, according to a survey research conducted for a year, the number of ethnic Korean-American citizens who have the immediate family members remaining in the DPRK is estimated over 104,000. He noted, "I wish that this data may be used to inform the Congress and help pass a bill to support the right of separated families to meeting their family in DPRK." The U.S. congress and media frequently use this research-based survey estimate as a semi-official estimate of this disadvantaged population group of American citizens of Korean ethnicity.

US Election Forecasting Studies: The ISR has accurately forecasted every presidential election since 2004 and the results of each midterm election. By using the 'ISR G3 Forecasting Model,' ISR predicted a win for President Bush in the 2004 elections by 51.1 percent in the popular vote compared to a 47.8 percent for John Kerry. The actual result was a 51 to 48 win for President Bush. During the 2008 presidential election, the ISR used the same model to predict a major win for Senator Barack Obama with 52.2 percent of the popular vote and 378 Electoral College votes. The actual result was an Obama win 52 percent of the popular vote and 364 Electoral College votes. The ISR has also successfully foreseen a Democrat win of the majority in both houses in the 2006 midterms and is the only organization that accurately predicted a 51 to 49 majority win for the Democratic Party in the Senate in 2006. The ISR also accurately forecasted a win for President Lee Myung Bak during the 2007 presidential election in the Republic of Korea.

=== Washington North Korea Forum ===
The ISR has hosted 14 forums since 1999 on critical issues of DPR Korea on Korea policies, presidential summit between North and South Korea, American policies towards Korea, economic development, public health, long-term relief and development, and energy rehabilitation, among others. The forum featuring influential senior governmental and non-governmental policymakers is the meeting place of all concerned about Korean issues, encouraging frank discussions on Korea policy options.

As an extension of the Washington North Korea Forum, the ISR hosted the first Korean Peninsula Reconciliation Forum in 2004 in Seoul, South Korea. As the Washington North Korea Forum focuses on discussing DPRK policy options in the United States, the United Nations, and international NGOs, the Korean Peninsula Reconciliation Forum focuses on encouraging discussions on DPRK among South Korean think tanks, forums, and NGOs.

=== Advocacy, Humanitarian Aid, and Partnership ===
The ISR coordinated a national advocacy campaign in 1998 to appeal the US government to send 500,000 tons of American wheat surplus to DPR Korea. The US government provided 300,000 tons of wheat aid to DPR Korea. The institute also appealed to the US government for sustaining humanitarian aid to DPR Korea in 2003. The ISR is a founding member of the InterAction North Korea Working Group, a consortium of about 30 international NGOs working in DPR Korea.

Computer Education for North Korean Teens has been gradually implemented after the ISR agreed with DPRK in 2001 to provide computer education to teens in a joint middle and high school on the humanitarian ground. This pilot computer education program is planned to extend to develop model high schools in other provinces. In the summer of 2008, DPRK and ISR agreed to establish computer labs in DPRK's middle schools and upgrade the computer curriculum to international standards. It was known to be the first computer education cooperation between DPRK and the international community to engage DPRK students in high schools.

=== The KEDO LWR Project and its Potential Benefits in Preparing DPRK for Energy Rehabilitation (Presented in the Washington North Korea Forum) ===
The United States (US), the Republic of Korea(ROK) and Japan formed in 1995 the Korean Peninsula Energy Development Organization (KEDO) to implement the Agreed Framework signed between the US and the DPRK in 1994. Under the Agreed Framework, the DPRK agreed to "freeze" and eventually dismantle its production reactors in return for two proliferation resistant commercial nuclear reactors of the light water type (LWR) and 500,000 metric tonsof heavy fuel oil each year, until the first LWR unit goes into operation.

John B. Mulligan, director of Project Operations discussed in his paper presented at the 7th Washington North Korea Forum hosted by the ISR, "If you spent more than a few hours in the DPRK, you are left with little doubt that its electrical power system is in need of major rehabilitation! Power blackouts are frequent, often leaving you sitting with your DPRK counterparts in a darkened meeting room." He continued to elaborate the antiquated energy situation of the DPRK by adding, "As you drive along the roads you will see an electrical distribution system in disrepair – power distribution poles with archaic porcelain insulators on power pole cross arms that are askew. Power lines are often drooping near the ground or have fallen down completely. Much of the sub-station equipment pre-dates WWII."

Despite years of funding and effort, however, KEDO had agreed in 2005 to terminate the light-water reactor project. On January 9, 2006, it was announced that the project was over and the workers should be returning to their home countries. On May 31, 2006, The Executive Board of KEDO decided to terminate the LWR project.

=== North and South Korea Science and Technology Conference (2006) ===
In 2006, Dr. Park Chan-Mo organized a North and South Korea Science Technology Conference. The conference promoted scientific collaboration between North and South Korean computer scientists, encouraging scientists from a divided nation to gather together for a common cause of peaceful use of science. Dr. Park demonstrated that non-governmental organizations and scientists across North and South Korea can cooperate and work together in the spirit of science diplomacy. Dr. Park had served as a faculty member and then President of Pohang University of Science and Technology (POSTECH), as honorary chairman of ISR, and as a senior adviser on science and technology to President Lee Myung-Bak; he was subsequently appointed the inaugural President (2009-2011) of the National Research Foundation of Korea (NRF), Dr. Park had already been invited to speak on his engagement with the Pyongyang Informatics Center at the US-Korea Science Policy Workshop, held in Washington, DC in 1998 on the occasion of the visit of President Kim Dae-Jun with President Clinton; his further continuing contributions to the development of the Pyongyang University of Science and Technology (PUST) have been described in successive articles in the AAAS's weekly Science.

=== Conversational English Program in DPR Korea – Project Seeds of Reconciliation ===
The ISR applied a computer-assisted system to teach conversational English to North Korean teens. Along with teaching software introduced to DPRK, the ISR was known to be the first-ever NGO to bring educators and have them teach North Korean high school students in classrooms. In the summer of 2008, five Korean American professionals of the ISR delegation taught conversational English to DPRK high school students. Based on an education model from the United Kingdom, ISR plans to improve quality of DPRK education program for both the teachers and the students in high schools.

== Global Research Internship Program(GRIP) ==
As a think tank and international relief and development organization headquartered in Washington DC, ISR recruits high school, undergraduate and graduate interns every year. These interns make contributions to international relief and development programs ISR is undertaking in North Korea in close consultation with the U.S. government, United Nations, and international non-governmental organizations. The goal of the ISR Global Internship Program is to help develop capable emerging leaders and researchers serving reconciliation in conflict regions, public health, innovative education, foreign policy, and international relief and development fit for the Reconciliation Vision 2020.

As an integral part of the ISR programs, GRIP interns are offered with opportunities which they can use and enhance their skills by working closely with international experts in the field. A number of internship programs are online based so overseas interns can have many opportunities to assist and contribute to new ISR programs of policy research and international relief and development. ISR interns locally available in Washington DC are offered with hands-on program experience of attending policy meetings and assisting with major events organized by ISR.

Profiled below are examples of duties performed by ISR interns.

1. Support education and health projects in DPRK: Conducting research on establishing a model computer lab in DPR Korea, implementing a conversational English program, and research on renovating a medical lab for the disabled.
2. Collaborate on research projects where interns can use their skills in writing, researching, website developing, database management, computer graphics.
3. Conduct research that involve science diplomacy with North Korea
4. Participate in a statistical research project analyzing and updating the United Nations programs in North Korea in areas of public health and education for children, disabled, and pregnant/nursing mothers
5. Support international faculty teaching in the Pyongyang Summer Institute in Survey Science and Quantitative Methodology
6. Assist coordinating the da Vinci Grant Program (a research grant program for college and university students in North Korea), grant writing, communicating with media outlets, organizing and participating in briefings.

== Institute Operations ==
The following centers and affiliated researchers implement the institute programs:

- Center for Advancement of Relief and Development
- Center for Public Health Studies
- Center for Foreign Policy Studies
- Center for Economic Studies
- Center for Educational Programs
- Center for Information Technology
- Center for Legal Studies
- Center for Survey Research

== Education and Training ==
The Reconciliation Academy is a Periodic educational program dedicated to the purpose of training Reconciliation Ambassadors with Medicines – RAMs are professionals serving in regions of humanitarian crisis or conflicts.

The Reconciliation Essay Contest is an Annual writing contest which motivates students in K-12 to be emerging leaders of reconciliation.

The Professionals without Borders is an Annual conference of professionals studying in the United States who come from countries which are currently divided or reunited, promoting best practices of conflict resolution.

== See also ==
- .kp, the Internet country code top-level domain (ccTLD) of the Democratic People's Republic of Korea.
