= Frederick A. Kolster =

Swiss-born American electrical engineer

Frederick A. Kolster (January 13, 1883 – 1950) was a Swiss-born United States electrical engineer and inventor. He set up the Kolster Radio Corporation.

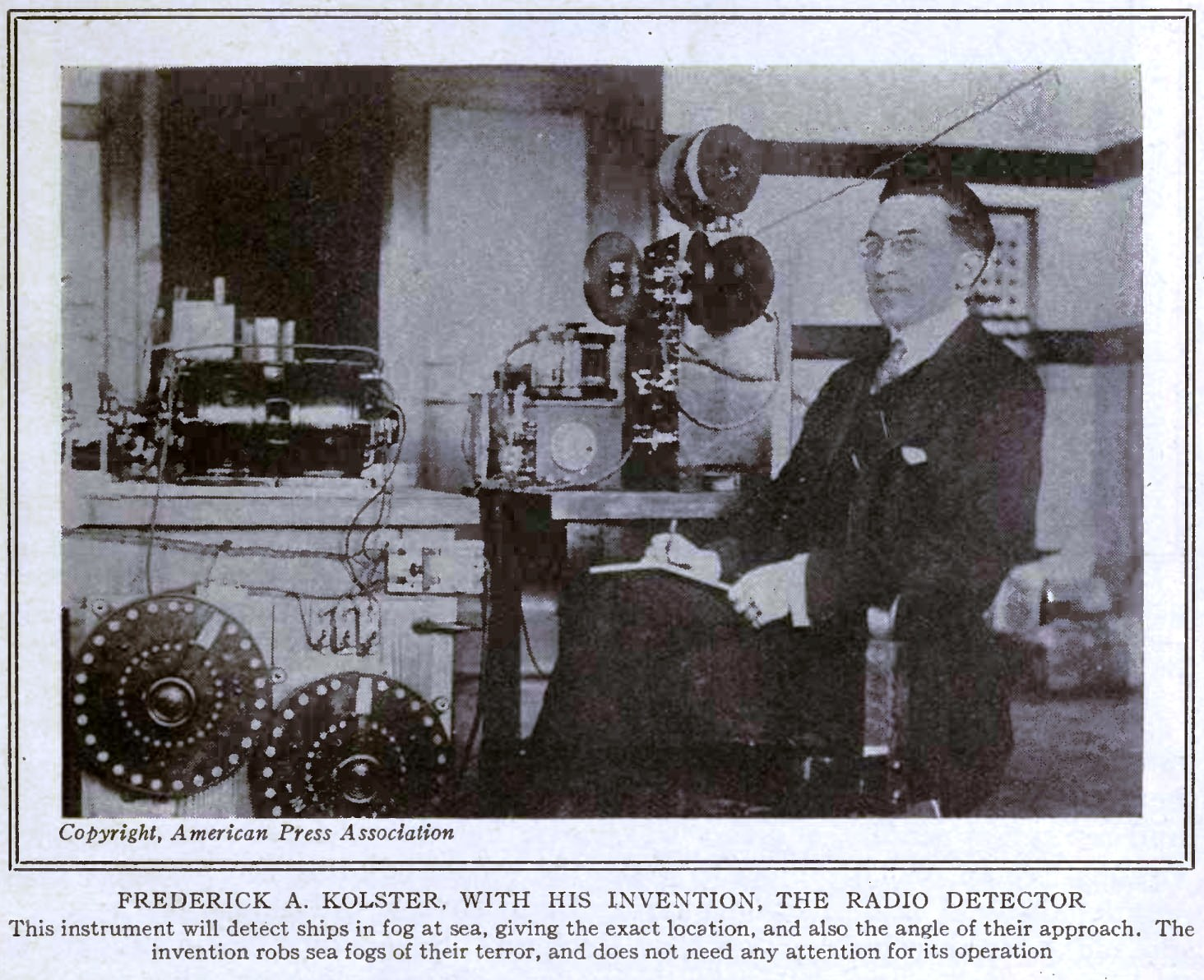
Frederick A. Kolster, was an electrical engineer and inventor.

== Career ==
Kolster worked at the National Bureau of Standards from 1911 to 1921. While at the NBS, he pioneered a number of developments in radio signal detection and radio compass work, including the Kolster Decremeter. In 1913, he convinced the Bureau of Lighthouses to install radio beacons at all important lighthouses and light ships. Kolster also patented in 1915 a radio direction finder, used in the subsequent World War I by U.S. destroyers at sea to locate German submarines.

In 1921, he left the National Bureau of Standards to join the Federal Telegraph Company as chief research engineer, as part of the company's bid to commercialize the radio compass technology to ships. Products manufactured under his research name came under the Federal-Brandes name (after November 1926). The commercial efforts failed, however, and the subsidiary of Federal Telegraph was spun off in April 1928, when the name was changed to Kolster Radio Corporation and a new stock offering was issued. The new company continued until dissolution in 1931.
