= High Tech High charter schools =

Charter schools in California, United States

High Tech High

Location
- 2861 Womble Rd, San Diego, CA 92106; 32.728750°N 117.220680°W

Information
- Type: Charter schools
- Founded: 2000
- School district: San Diego Unified School District
- Student to teacher ratio: 25 to 1
- Website: www.hightechhigh.org

High Tech High is a San Diego, California–based school-development organization that includes a network of charter schools, a teacher certification program, and a graduate school of education. Students are admitted to the public elementary, middle, and high schools through a zip-code based lottery system in an effort to admit a demographically diverse representative sample of San Diego County.

== History ==
In the time of 1996, forty members of San Diego's civic and high-tech industry assembled to discuss how to engage and prepare more young people for the high-tech industry. Called upon by the San Diego Economic Development Corporation and Business Roundtable, these members met regularly for the next two years to discuss how to engage and prepare local students for high-tech careers. One of these members included Gary E. Jacobs, former director of education programs at Qualcomm.

The original "High Tech High School" is now known as Gary and Jerri-Ann Jacobs High Tech High.

In 2000, San Diego Unified School District approved the first charter and construction began in a former U.S. Navy training center in the Point Loma district, now known as Liberty Station, near the San Diego airport. The grouping of High Tech High schools in this area is known as the High Tech High Village. With a grant from the Bill & Melinda Gates Foundation, High Tech High opened with 200 students in the 9th and 10th grades in September. In 2003, the first graduating class graduated with 50 students. In 2006, the Statewide Benefit Charter was approved. In 2007, High Tech High Digital Commons launched. In 2009, the statewide Benefit Charter was expanded to K-12.

In 2010, it had approximately 3,500 students in high, middle, and elementary schools. The HTH website states that in 2010, 100% of high school graduates were accepted to colleges, of which 80% were to four-year institutions. As of 2008, 99% percent of graduates had entered college. As of 2015, 98% of students attended college after graduation, with around 75% attending 4-year schools. According to statistics from that year, students of HTH scored higher than others within their demographic groups elsewhere in the state.

== Enrollment ==
Based on the 2019–20 school year, 503 students attend High Tech High. When divided by grade levels, 126 students were in 9th grade, 127 in 10th, 130 in 11th, and 120 in 12th. The school is 46.1% Hispanic or Latino, 31.8% White, 8% Asian, 8% two or more races, 5.2% African American, 0.6% American Indian or Alaskan Native and 0.2% Native Hawaiian or Pacific Islander.

== Program design principles ==
The High Tech High program and curriculum evolved from the work of Larry Rosenstock and colleagues in the New Urban High School Project, an initiative of the U.S. Department of Education's Office of Vocational and Adult Education. The focus was on inner-city high schools using school-to-work strategies, including internships and other forms of field work, as a leverage for whole-school change. The findings of the NUHS were summarized in guides centered on six design principles. The school is virtually textbook-free. HTH is structured around four design principles, including three from NUHS and one developed by HTH:

- personalization
- adult world connection
- common intellectual mission
- teacher as designer

These principles determined the schools' organization, including their small size, the openness of the facilities, personalization, emphasis on integrated and project-based learning, and display and exhibitions of student work. All students are required to complete internships in the community. HTH director Ben Daley described the school's approach: "We are teaching students to think deeply about content and then do something with their knowledge, not just race through a textbook.” According to Rosenstock, who became a CEO of HTH, a slogan at High Tech High is: “You can play video games at HTH, but only if you make them here.”

== Governance and funding ==
The schools operate within San Diego Unified School District but the High Tech High organization is governed by three independent boards of directors:

- The High Tech High Board operates as a public agency and has governance and fiduciary level control over all HTH schools.
- HTH Learning is a private nonprofit that oversees the facilities that house the schools of High Tech High. It is also responsible for the adult learning programs, including the teacher certification program, and the related residencies and institutes.
- The High Tech High Foundation is a private nonprofit responsible for securing the philanthropic support needed to develop High Tech High schools.

The schools are publicly funded although they have received grants from private companies and organizations. The Bill & Melinda Gates Foundation contributed $17 million between 2000 and 2006.

== Schools ==
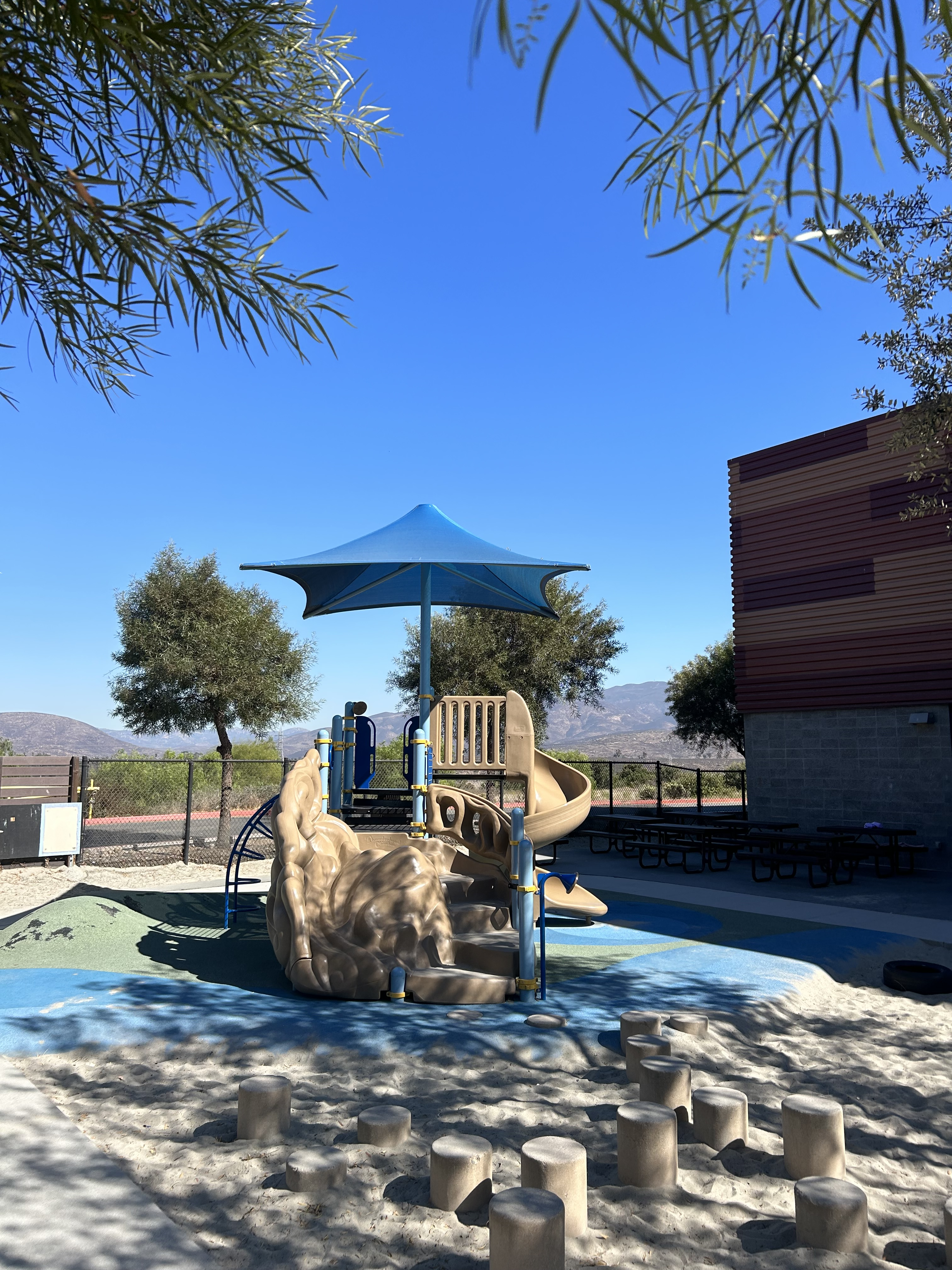
HTECV Playground, 2024

- High Tech Elementary Explorer
- High Tech Elementary Point Loma
- High Tech Elementary Chula Vista
- High Tech Elementary North County
- High Tech Elementary Mesa
- High Tech Middle Chula Vista
- High Tech Middle
- High Tech Middle Media Arts
- High Tech Middle North County
- High Tech Middle Mesa
- The Gary and Jerri-Ann Jacobs High Tech High
- High Tech High International
- High Tech High Media Arts
- High Tech High Mesa
- High Tech High Chula Vista
- High Tech High North County

Formerly there was also a High Tech High Bayshore, in Redwood City.

== Student learning ==
=== Notable projects ===
San Diego Bay Study

Since 2003, Jay Vavra and the juniors of Gary and Jerri-Ann Jacobs High Tech High have started and maintained the San Diego Bay Study, producing four books on what students deemed “pressing environmental priorities.” Conservationist Jane Goodall wrote the foreword to the initial The Two Sides of Sides of the Bay Channel: A Field Guide. and the second study, Perspectives from the San Diego Bay: A Field Guide in which students used John Steinbeck's The Log from the Sea of Cortez as the model for a more humanitarian guide.

The Blood Bank Project

In 2009, a team of seniors, led by art teacher Jeff Robin and biology/multimedia teacher Blair Hatch, collaborated with the San Diego Blood Bank to raise awareness for the need to donate blood. Students researched several blood-related topics, ranging from leukemia to the AIDS epidemic to the depiction of blood in films to the role of blood in various religions. In pairs, students created paintings large piece of wood with cut-outs for a student-created informational video. The products were displayed at the JETT Art Gallery in San Diego.

The End of the World Project (and co-design)

In 2012, sixth-graders at High Tech Middle co-designed a project with teachers Bobby Shaddox and Allie Wong. Building on the work of democratic educator James Beane, Shaddox and Wong asked students to generate questions they had about themselves and the world around them. They categorized these questions and then determined that many questions fell under the broader theme of “The End of the World.” Teachers then pitched the idea of creating a magazine and multimedia exhibition informing the public of the plausibility of the various (and rumored) ways in which the world might be brought to an end. In pairs, students researched topics ranging from global warming to deforestation to the Mayan prophecies. Students included interviews from local experts in their articles. Because teachers wanted to establish a democratic working environment, student input on the process was ongoing. Students were asked to tune project components, utilize peer feedback, and meet regularly as a whole-class community to make decisions about the process and product.

The Raptors for Rodents Project

In 2014, fifth-graders at High Tech Elementary Chula Vista were visited regularly by the field mice that populated the open landscape surrounding the building. Students led by teacher Jeff Govoni researched the local predators of these rodents to determine which might be the safest and most effective way to reduce the population. Students determined that owls would have the greatest impact and so they then, in teams, investigated and created prototypes for owl boxes. In order to raise funding to build life-size versions, students wrote persuasive letters and created multimedia presentations. Upon funding, students built the nests, erected their original owl boxes and did, in fact, reduce the population of field mice in their school.

=== Extracurriculars ===
The Holy Cows

The Holy Cows are a robotics team co-founded by High Tech High engineering teacher David Berggren and his father, Bill Berggren in 2004. The team runs like a business, with students fulfilling roles including student directors, managers, and supervisors of various departments. Students are mentored by local engineering experts, to accrue skills through the building of robots. In alignment with the High Tech High mission, they also learn to manage projects as a team. The Holy Cows have traveled to the FIRST Robotics World Championship eight times, as of 2013 and won the top prize, the Chairman's Award, in 2013. The team also mentors other robotics teams and offers workshops. In 2014, the Holy Cows and their robot were one of five robotics teams that opened the Macy's Thanksgiving Day Parade.

== Adult learning ==
While HTH distilled its first three learning principles from The Urban School Project, it added a fourth: "Teacher as Designer" and employs a rigorous hiring process. It also stated a commitment to educating educators.

=== Teacher hiring and support ===
After an initial pre-screening of application materials, prospective teachers are invited to attend a day-long hiring “Bonanza” on a High Tech High school. In addition to touring the schools and mingling with prospective co-workers, they implement an hour-long lesson to class of students. Students are integral to the hiring process at High Tech High. Not only do they offer their feedback on the demonstration lesson, but they are invited to read and engage in a discussion with applicants on a sensitive, but relevant, topic as current High Tech High educators observe. Hiring is competitive, and many vie for spots that open annually. Although High Tech High is publicly funded, it operates under its own board of directors, and thus can create its own hiring process. Directors of the school's campuses take teacher and student feedback into account, along with their current school needs, when offering candidates a position. High Tech High teachers are contracted for one year and do not receive tenure, nor do they have a teachers' union.

On April 20, 2021, teacher representatives presented their intent to unionize to site directors on all 16 High Tech High campuses. In response, CEO Rasheed Meadows cancelled promised raises, retained representation, and fired a teacher who helped organize the unionization effort, a form of union busting.

In February 2023, High Tech Education Collective ratified its first contract as a union, which supports the teachers of High Tech charter schools. They aim to increase funding for retaining staff to provide equity in pay and cost of living. Teachers are attracted to the project-based learning but have to design the curriculum themselves.

=== Teacher credentialing ===
High Tech High is authorized by the California Commission on Teacher Credentialing to offer preliminary and professional credentials. It offers two programs: The Intern Program for preliminary teaching credentials and the two-year Induction Program for teachers with preliminary teaching credentials.

In order to invite qualified applicants who do not yet hold teaching credential to work with High Tech High, the organization developed its own credential program in 2004, becoming the state's first approved charter-management organization (CMO) to do so. Educators who wish to work with High Tech High may earn a teaching credential through the Teacher Intern Program. Those who possess (at a minimum) B.A. or B.S. upon hiring and demonstrate subject-matter competence may apply for employment under the condition that they will enroll concurrently in a credential and induction program. The credential program is accredited by the California Commission on Teacher Credentialing, is recognized for resisting the theoretical approach many credential programs are criticized for, and adopting a clinical approach, akin to a medical residency. It authorizes Single-Subject, Multiple Subjects and Education Specialist credentials for staff and non-HTH teachers. Most interns teach full-time while earning their credentials, earning a regular salary and benefits. Graduates of the program present a portfolio of their work, demonstrating that they have met the qualifications to be licensed as a teacher in the state of California.

In 2004, High Tech High was authorized to move teachers from preliminary to clear credential through an induction (BTSA) program. The High Tech High Teacher Induction (BTSA) program began in 2007.

=== Graduate School of Education ===
The Graduate School of Education opened in September 2007, offering Master of Education Degrees (M.Ed.) in Teacher Leadership and School Leadership to educators in and outside of the network of High Tech High schools. In 2012, the school was granted candidacy for accreditation by WASC (Western Association of Schools and Colleges), and the school became fully accredited in 2016. The school's president, Dr. Rob Riordan, formerly a leader of the teaching practicum at the Harvard Graduate School of Education worked with school founder (and GSE Dean, with a total compensation of $420,202 reported in the school's 2015 990 federal tax form) Larry Rosenstock on the New Urban High School Project and as High Tech High's “Emperor of Rigor". According to administrative dean Allison Ohle, the school emphasizes “the value of collaboration and real-life experiences”. Like the credential program, the graduate school emphasizes a clinical and practical approach while also exploring educational theory. Students are required to complete an “action research” project during the second year of the program, in which they explore a learning problem or wondering within their own school site. The results are published in the required thesis. Students develop skills to work collaboratively and design courses in which their own students “construct new knowledge” and “pursue their passions.” The Graduate School of Education hosts residencies, institutes, and workshops and its students participate in the High Tech High Summer Institute.

Leading Schools Program
The Leading Schools Program (LSP) is a one-year certificate program that engages international and national teams of educators in online discussions and onsite residencies at High Tech High schools. Participants collaborate with, and are mentored by, current High Tech High educators as they create and carry out a leadership project that “addresses and authentic need or issue at their home schools."

=== UnBoxed: Journal and Speaker Series ===
UnBoxed is a peer-reviewed journal published twice annually by the High Tech High Graduate School of Education. Articles feature reflections on practice, project descriptions, and remarks on current policy. Contributors have included current faculty and graduate school students, as well as educators and researchers from various national and international institutions.

As part of the Education UnBoxed Speaker Series, educators such as co-founder of The Civil Rights Project, Gary Orfield, Professor James Gee, and co-author of Disrupting Class: How Disruptive Education Will Change the Way the World Learns, Michael Horn, have spoken on campus and through interactive, online platforms such as Elluminate. In addition, the graduate school hosts monthly “Collegial Conversations” in which educators are invited to discuss student work, methods of assessment, and developing projects using conversation protocols.
