= Office of Sustainability =

The Office of Sustainability (formerly Chula Vista CLEAN) is a sustainability organization based in Chula Vista, California. It was established in 2007 in order to help find new and adaptive solutions to environmental problems impacting the city and its surrounding region.

== Members/Stakeholders ==
The CLEAN group consists of many different city entities who have environmental interests in Chula Vista. The city's Conservation, Environmental Services, and Stormwater sections of Public Works take an active role in the group's proceedings while receiving additional feedback from other city departments such as Building & Planning, Engineering, the public libraries, and the Chula Vista Nature Center. Non-profit organizations, local businesses, and environmental community groups make up the stakeholder portion of this group.

Current member stakeholders of the CLEAN group include:

- Allied Waste
- California Native Plant Society – San Diego Chapter
- Chula Vista Chamber of Commerce
- Chula Vista Community Collaborative
- Chula Vista Garden Club
- Clean Energy Fuels
- Friends of Del Rey Canyon
- High Tech High Chula Vista
- I Love A Clean San Diego
- National Audubon Society – San Diego Chapter
- Otay Valley Regional Park
- Otay Water District
- Port of San Diego
- REI Chula Vista
- San Diego Gas & Electric/Sempra Energy
- Southwestern College (California)
- South Bay Family YMCA
- Sweetwater Authority
- Third Avenue Village Association
- Tijuana River Estuary
- Volunteer San Diego

== CLEAN Business Program and ICLEI Green Business Challenge ==
One of the CLEAN group's main focuses is to encourage environmental stewardship and practice in the business community. Businesses that participate in the City of Chula Vista's CLEAN Business program are recognized as local companies that are leaders in terms of efficiency, conservation, and waste reduction. A business is CLEAN if it has adopted best practices in four main areas: pollution prevention, energy conservation, water conservation, and solid waste reduction. By being officially recognized as a CLEAN Business a business can receive free advertising and promotion of their business, community recognition of their voluntary efforts to improve the environment, cost savings through improved efficiency, water and energy conservation, and waste reduction, and free assistance in making CLEAN changes to their business.

The city of Chula Vista is partnering with Office Depot and ICLEI to start a Green Business Challenge in 2011. The city of Chula Vista as well as representatives from the cities of Austin, TX, Bellevue, WA, and the Triangle J Council of Governments (made up of Chatham, Durham, Johnston, Lee, Moore, Orange and Wake counties in North Carolina) joined ICLEI USA and Office Depot officials at the New York Stock Exchange to mark this important occasion. As part of the program, Chula Vista businesses will be encouraged to implement new strategies to improve the environmental performance of their business over a 12-month time period.

== Events ==
The CLEAN group participates in and sponsors many events throughout the year to reach out to the community of Chula Vista. Their largest event is the yearly Go Green & Clean Family Day held around Earth Day, which is a family event with the YMCA to help promote active lifestyles and environmental awareness.

The CLEAN group also frequently participates in SDG&E lighting exchanges where residential customers can receive free fluorescent light bulbs in exchange for incandescent light bulbs. They also coordinate waste recycling events that help residents of Chula Vista, South San Diego, Imperial Beach, and National City responsibly dispose of sensitive household hazardous waste. The Clean group also engages Chula Vista residents at local farmers' markets held weekly at both Chula Vista's Third Avenue on Thursdays and at Otay Ranch Town Center Mall on Tuesdays.
