= Paul E. Jacobs =

American businessman

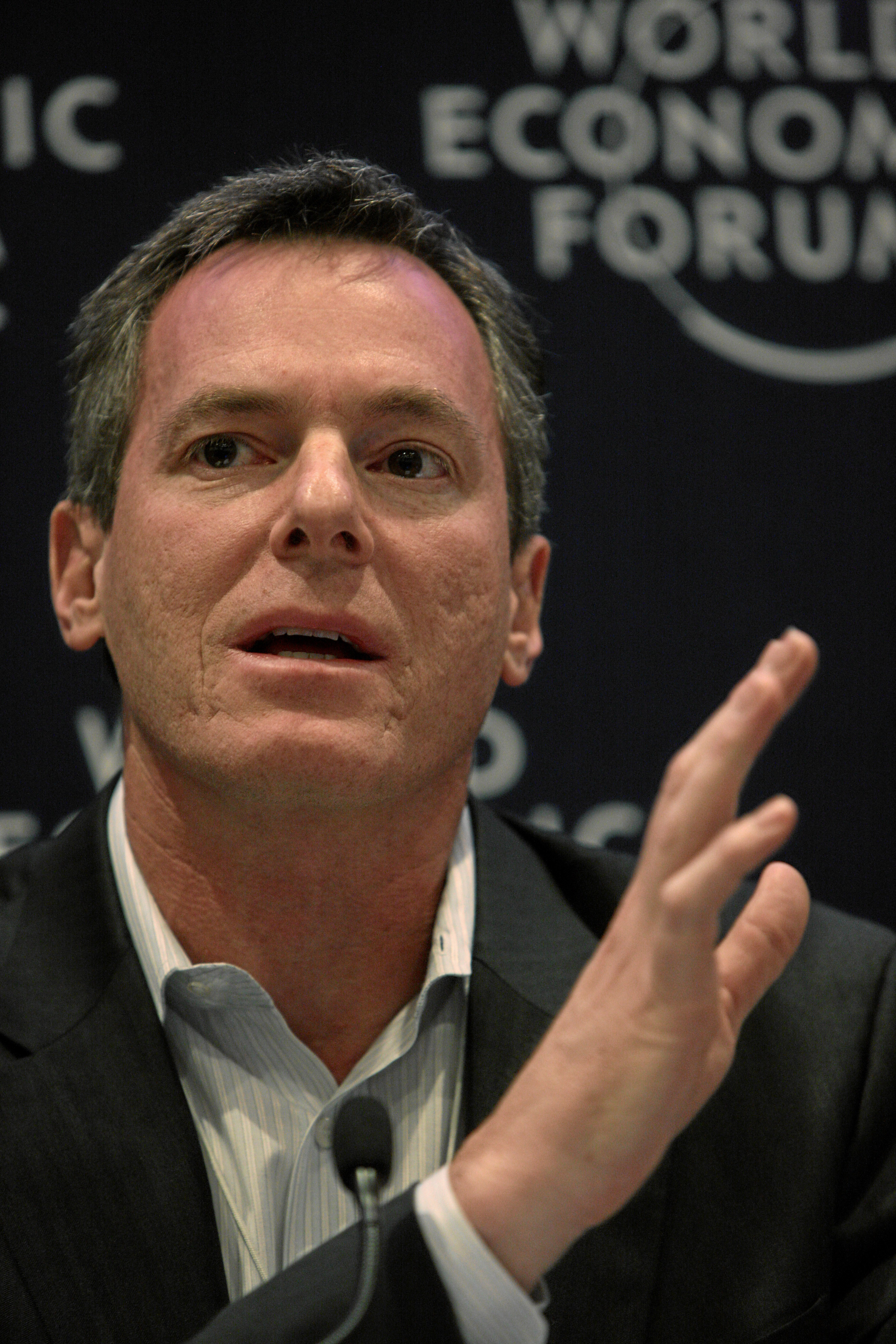
- Jacobs in 2010
- Born: October 30, 1962 (age 64)
- Education: University of California, Berkeley (BS, MS, PhD)
- Occupations: Chairman Qualcomm; CEO Globalstar
- Spouse(s): Stacy Jacobs (m. 1991; div. 2016) Geneviève Tremblay (m. 2016)
- Children: 5
- Parent: Irwin M. Jacobs
- Relatives: Gary E. Jacobs (brother); Sara Jacobs (niece)

Paul E. Jacobs (born October 30, 1962) is an American businessman. He is the CEO of Globalstar and the former executive chairman of Qualcomm.

== Family and education ==
Jacobs was born to Joan (née Klein) and Irwin M. Jacobs. His father was co-founder of Linkabit and Qualcomm. He has three brothers: Gary E. Jacobs (born 1958), Hal Jacobs (born 1960), and Jeffrey A. Jacobs (born 1966). His niece Sara Jacobs represents California's 51st congressional district in the U.S. House of Representatives.

He earned a BS in Engineering and Computer Science in 1984, an MS degree in Electrical Engineering in 1986, and a PhD degree in Electrical Engineering and Computer Science in 1989 from the University of California, Berkeley.

== Career ==
Jacobs started at Qualcomm as an engineer in the wireless technology development group in 1990. He became president of Qualcomm Wireless and Internet Group in July 2001, and then the chief executive office (CEO) of Qualcomm in July 2005. He became the executive chairman of Qualcomm in March 2009, a position he held until 2018.

In December 2013, Qualcomm announced that Jacobs would step down as CEO and be replaced by president and COO Steve Mollenkopf from March 2014.

On May 28, 2013, Jacobs, along with his three brothers, became minority owners in the Sacramento Kings in a partnership with Vivek Ranadivé and Mark Mastrov. The NBA approved the sale on May 28.

In 2016, Jacobs was elected a member of the National Academy of Engineering.

In March 2018, Qualcomm announced that Jacobs would be stepping down as the company's executive chairman. On March 16, 2018, Qualcomm removed Jacobs from its board, after he "broached a long-shot bid" for a buyout earlier that week. The company also announced that Jacobs would not be re-nominated to its board of directors at the March 23 annual stockholder meeting. “The board reached that decision following his notification to the Board that he has decided to explore the possibility of making a proposal to acquire Qualcomm,” the company said, adding that its board will consist of 10 directors at the meeting.

== Awards and recognition ==
In 2015, he received the Distinguished Industry Leader Award, and in 2014 received the IEEE Ernst Weber Managerial Leadership Award. His other awards include the 2013 Edison Achievement Award.

== Personal life ==
In 1991, Jacobs married Stacy Bracken; they had three children. The couple divorced in 2016.

In 2016, he married French-Canadian Geneviève Tremblay, born in 1982; they have two daughters together.
