= Nelson X. Wang =

Technology entrepreneur

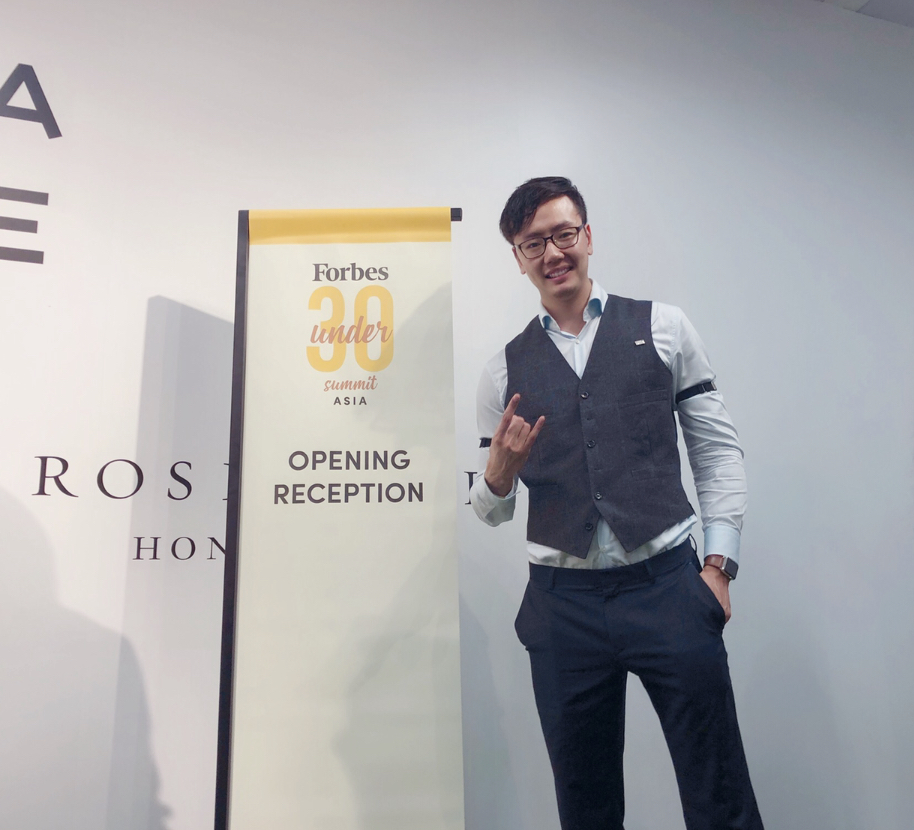
- Wang in 2019
- Born: October 1989 (age 36); Xi'an China
- Education: Massachusetts Institute of Technology
- Occupations: Entrepreneur, engineer, businessman
- Height: 6 ft 2 in (188 cm)
- Awards: Forbes 30 Under 30, Forbes 2019; Global People/Wealth, People's Daily 2016

Chinese name
- Traditional Chinese: 王遜拓
- Simplified Chinese: 王逊拓
Transcriptions
Standard Mandarin
- Hanyu Pinyin: Wáng Xùntuò
- IPA: [wǎŋ ɕŷntʰwô]

Nelson Wang Xuntuo (Chinese: 王逊拓; pinyin: Wáng Xùntuò), also known as Nelson X. Wang, is a Chinese entrepreneur educated in the United States. He was elected to Forbes 30 Under 30 for his contributions in renewable energy technologies. He attended the Massachusetts Institute of Technology (MIT) where he was elected as Irwin M. Jacobs and Joan K. Jacobs Presidential Fellow. His tech start-up story was featured on People's Daily.

== Biography ==
Wang is a Chinese entrepreneur educated in the United States. He is a Forbes 30 Under 30. He studied in Electrical Engineering and Computer Science at the Massachusetts Institute of Technology where he was elected an Irwin M. Jacobs Presidential Fellow. He also completed business minor via MBA program at Harvard Business School.

=== Early life ===
Wang was born in Xi'an, China, grew up in Shanghai with his parents, then attended the Massachusetts Institute of Technology where he was elected an Irwin Jacobs Presidential Fellow.

== Honours and awards ==
- Forbes 30 Under 30, Forbes.
- Irwin Jacobs Presidential Fellow, Massachusetts Institute of Technology 2012
