= Liberty Station, San Diego =

Mixed-use development in San Diego, California

Liberty Station is a mixed-use development in San Diego, California, on the site of the former Naval Training Center San Diego. It is located in the Point Loma community of San Diego. It has a waterfront location, on a boat channel off San Diego Bay, just west of San Diego International Airport and a few miles north of downtown San Diego. The 361-acre (1.46 km^{2}) project includes several distinct districts: a retail and commercial district, a promenade focused on nonprofit activities, an arts district, educational district, residential district, hotel district, office district, worship centers, and a 40-acre park/open space area along the boat channel, for recreational activities and special events.

The Naval Training Center site is listed on the National Register of Historic Places, and many of the individual structures are designated as historic by the City of San Diego. Dozens of the historical buildings are being adapted for stores, offices, schools, art galleries, and other purposes.

== History ==
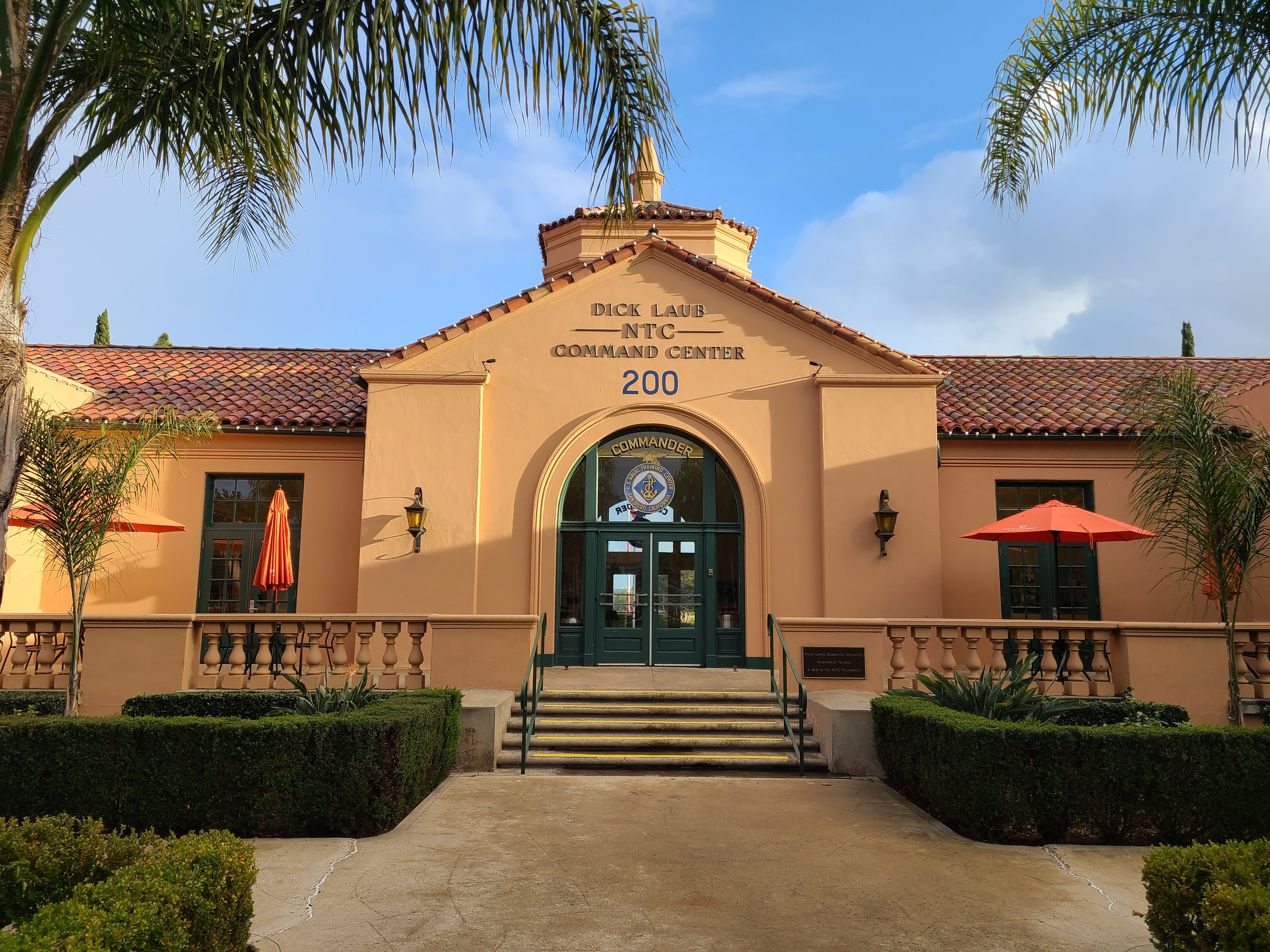
Dick Laub NTC Command Center

The project started when the Navy announced in 1993 that it was closing the San Diego training center. The City of San Diego created a 27-member commission to determine what to do with the site. The commission developed and the city accepted a detailed plan that served as the basis for a request for quotation from a master developer; The Corky McMillin Company was selected. The base closed with a ceremony on March 21, 1997.

In November 2012, Phase Two of the renovation was completed, bringing the total number of buildings successfully adapted to fifteen. The nonprofit NTC Foundation oversees the development of the historic and nonprofit area. According to Foundation director Alan Ziter, "This is the largest historical preservation project in San Diego and it's also the city's largest arts and culture project in terms of size and scope. It's been slow and steady. But we'll get it done."

In 2014, the NTC Command Center was named in honor of Richard “Dick” Laub, a Point Loma realtor and Navy veteran, after his widow donated $1.5 million USD to the NTC Foundation.

Since 2002, 50+ buildings have been renovated and repurposed. Liberty Station is now home to a diverse array of restaurants, art galleries, shops, hotels, schools, and cultural institutions. In September 2025, the Irwin and Joan Jacobs Performing Arts Theater—nicknamed “The Joan” opened its 56th building, further enriching the cultural landscape of Liberty Station.

== Retail ==
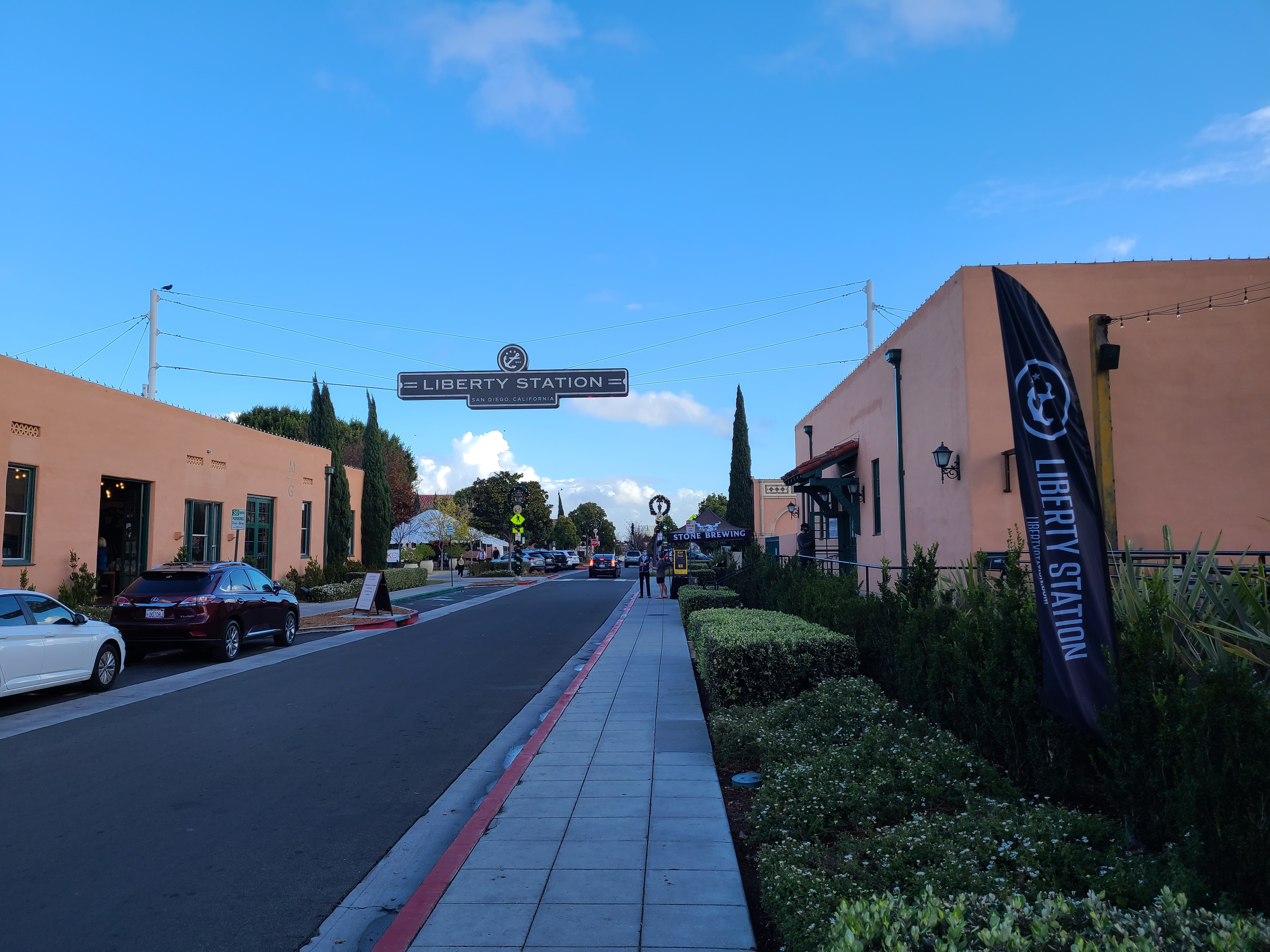
Liberty Station in December 2020

Liberty Station is home to more than 300 businesses, offering a mix of national retailers and locally owned establishments. The commercial landscape includes grocery stores such as Trader Joe’s and Vons, as well as popular dining chains like Chick-fil-A, Five Guys, Luna Grill, and Tender Greens. In addition to these larger brands, Liberty Station features a wide variety of independently operated boutiques, artisan shops, fitness and wellness studios, and creative workspaces.

The area supports a diverse range of commercial activity and encourages pedestrian-friendly exploration. The Arts District, in particular, is home to numerous galleries, artist studios, and performance spaces that contribute to the site's identity as a cultural and creative hub.

Anchor tenants of the retail and commercial districts include Vons and Trader Joe's. There are several dozen restaurants, including several Starbucks coffee shops, and a variety of retail shops. In May 2013, Stone Brewing World Bistro and Gardens opened on Historic Decatur Road. The 23,500-square-foot (2,180 m^{2}) facility cost $8 million and can seat 700 patrons; it is the largest retail enterprise at Liberty Station. In May 2016 Boffo Cinemas opened a six-screen multiplex theater called The Lot; it is located in the renovated historic Luce Auditorium.

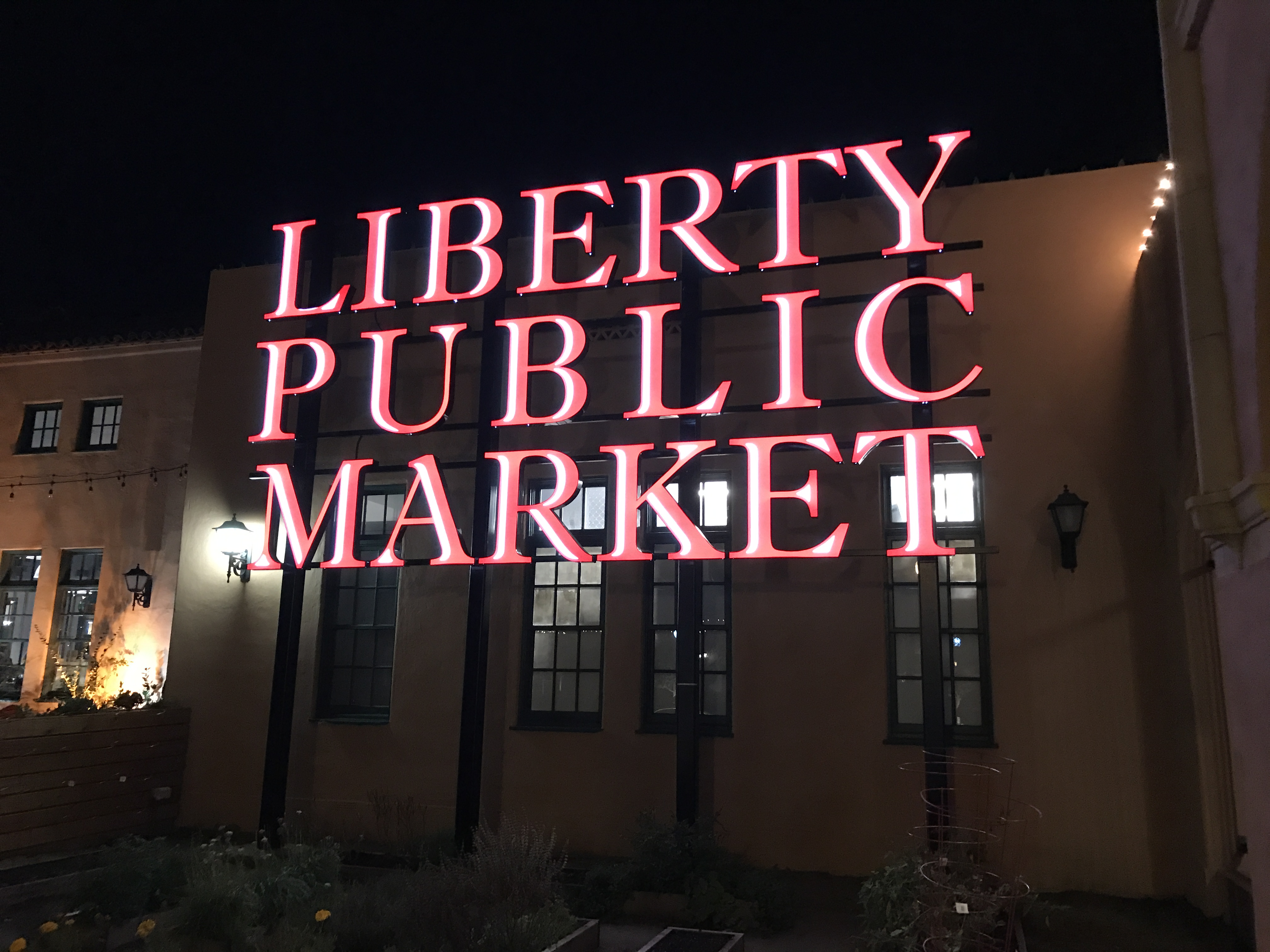
Public market at Liberty Station

Several of the retail establishments, including Vons and Stone Brewing, are built inside historic structures from Naval Training Center days. In order to maintain the external appearance of the historic structures they have unusual layouts. The Vons store occupies two separate buildings, formerly barracks, separated by an open courtyard. Stone Brewing incorporates multiple buildings including the former mess hall.

Liberty Public Market has a diverse range of food and beverage options. Visitors can explore a variety of stalls and counters offering everything from fresh produce and gourmet foods to craft beer and specialty cocktails. Liberty Public Market has many artisans and merchants, emphasizing more on vintage clothing and jewelry stands.

Liberty Station is also home to the historic Sail Ho Golf Course, which was built in the 1920s by Albert Spalding of Spalding Sports. Being the oldest golf course in San Diego, it was originally the San Diego Country Club called the Loma Club. It also used to be utilized by the Navy as a fitness training area for recruits. Sail Ho has recently been renovated by Cary Bickler who redesigned the fairways, greens, and practice facilities. Other famous golfers who have invested their time at Sail Ho include Craig Stadler and Phil Mickelson, both of whom played junior golf tournaments at Sail Ho. In 2021, 18 holes of miniature golf was added.

== Arts district ==
A view of the ARTS DISTRICT in 2026

Murals painted on archways at Arts District Liberty Station

Arts District Liberty Station is a group of historic buildings being renovated for the display of arts, science, culture, and technology. The arts district was established in 2000 as a 501c3 nonprofit organization to enrich the lives of San Diegans, by renovating 26 historic buildings and creating, facilitating, and operating as a 100-acre creative district. It houses theater groups, dance companies, museums, galleries, and classes of many kinds. There are also several venues for public and private events, including the former mess hall of the Naval Training Center. The base's former command center and the former parade ground are also included in the ARTS DISTRICT. The command center building contains displays about the history of NTC and of Point Loma, and has an adjacent rose garden which was planted by the wife of an early base commander. This 28-acre (11 ha) area is operated by the non-profit NTC Foundation.

The term "promenade" is also used to describe a landscaped linear open-space area that runs the length of the development.

=== Installations ===
Liberty Station’s “Installations at the Station” program introduces a new rotation of site-specific art every year. In 2026, the program featured works by artists Enrique “Chikle” Lugo and Laura Esela Huerta.

"Estación Libertad" by Enrique "Chikle" Lugo, photographed at Liberty Station, Fall 2026.

Lugo’s installation, a mural titled “Estación Libertad,” is designed in honor of San Diego and Tijuana spirit, featuring imagery of traditional American tattooing. Huerta’s installation, a sensory pavilion titled “Memory of Soil,” is made in remembrance of the shared border territory between California and Baja California.

== Upcoming Exhibits ==
=== Holocaust Museum ===
The RUTH (remember the holocaust) organization is planning on making a permanent placement of the Holocaust exhibit for the Arts District at Liberty Station. The organizers for RUTH along with the CEO, Moise Fleitman, hope to open the exhibit in summer of 2028. Their purpose of opening the museum in Liberty Station is to educate those who know little about the Holocaust and to identify the signs of hatred and authoritarianism.

== Education ==
The educational area of Liberty Station consists of High Tech Village, a group of public charter schools collectively known as High Tech High and Rock Academy. High Tech High's campus includes five high schools, two middle schools, and two elementary schools. The schools are part of the San Diego City Schools. Rock Academy serves preschool to grade 12.

== Residential ==
The residential area of Liberty Station has two main sections, one section for military housing and the other a residential community developed by the McMillin Corporation. The military housing area is not properly part of the Liberty Station development and is still owned by the U.S. Government. It includes 500 units, mostly townhomes, and also features children's playgrounds and sports facilities. The exterior of the housing is in a Spanish architectural style in keeping with traditional San Diego.

The civilian residential community includes townhomes, row homes, and single family homes. In 2007 it was named by Money magazine as one of the best places to retire in San Diego. However, people of all ages live in the community, young families as well as retired couples.

== Hotels ==
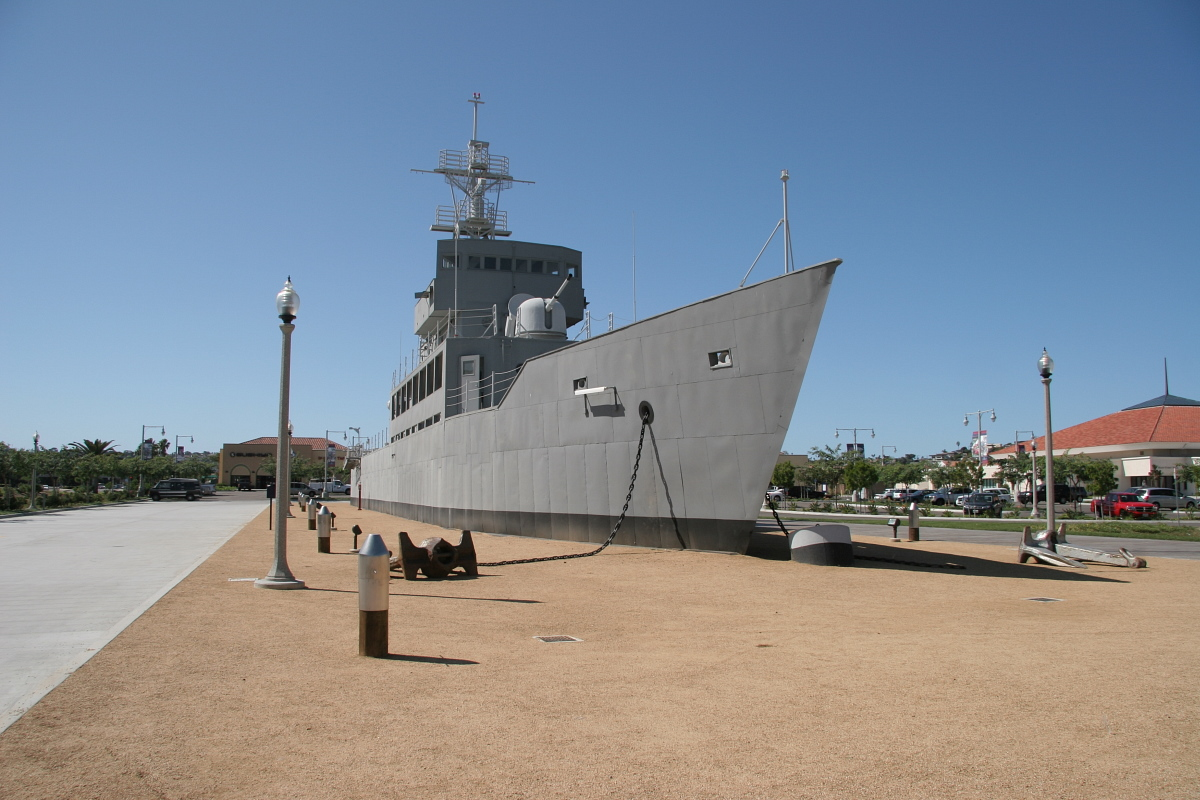
USS Recruit (TDE-1) in the Hotel District of Liberty Station. 32.72847°N 117.21632°W

The hotel area of Liberty Station includes several hotels: Homewood Suites by Hilton, Courtyard by Marriot, Hampton Inn & Suites by Hilton, and Townplace Suites by Marriot. A new hotel is under construction and will be opening in late 2027. The hotel area also contains the historic training structure USS Recruit (TDE-1). Formerly a commissioned "non-ship" of the U.S. Navy, this is a two-thirds scale model of a Navy frigate built right into the ground. She was used to teach shipboard procedures to recruits and was affectionately nicknamed the USS Neversail. She is open to the public for tours on Fridays from 1pm - 5pm and Saturdays and Sundays from 12pm - 4pm. She is visible from North Harbor Drive.

== Offices ==
The office area is a collection of newly built office buildings whose architecture reflects the Spanish Colonial Revival style of the original NTC buildings.

== Rock Church ==
Rock Church, a nondenominational, evangelical megachurch, was constructed in 2005 and opened in 2007. It occupies the site of the former Technical Training Center at Service School Command San Diego (Building 94, constructed 1969). The building houses new Christian education facilities, office space, and a 3,500 seat worship center, making it one of the largest auditoriums in Southern California. The church currently averages 12,000 in attendance per week, making it the largest church in San Diego. Adjacent to the church is the Rock Academy, a private Christian school serving students from pre-kindergarten through twelfth grade.

In May 2012, the San Diego County Grand Jury issued a report concluding that the church's location in an area designated for education use is inappropriate, and recommending that the city "Suspend the current Conditional Use Permit for the Rock Academy and Church pending a review for compliance and compatibility with the NTC Precise Plan and Local Coastal Program report (September 2001) and determine the Church’s appropriateness for that area." However, in August the mayor said he would not suspend the church's permit, describing the proposed suspension as "unreasonable".

== 52 Boats Memorial ==
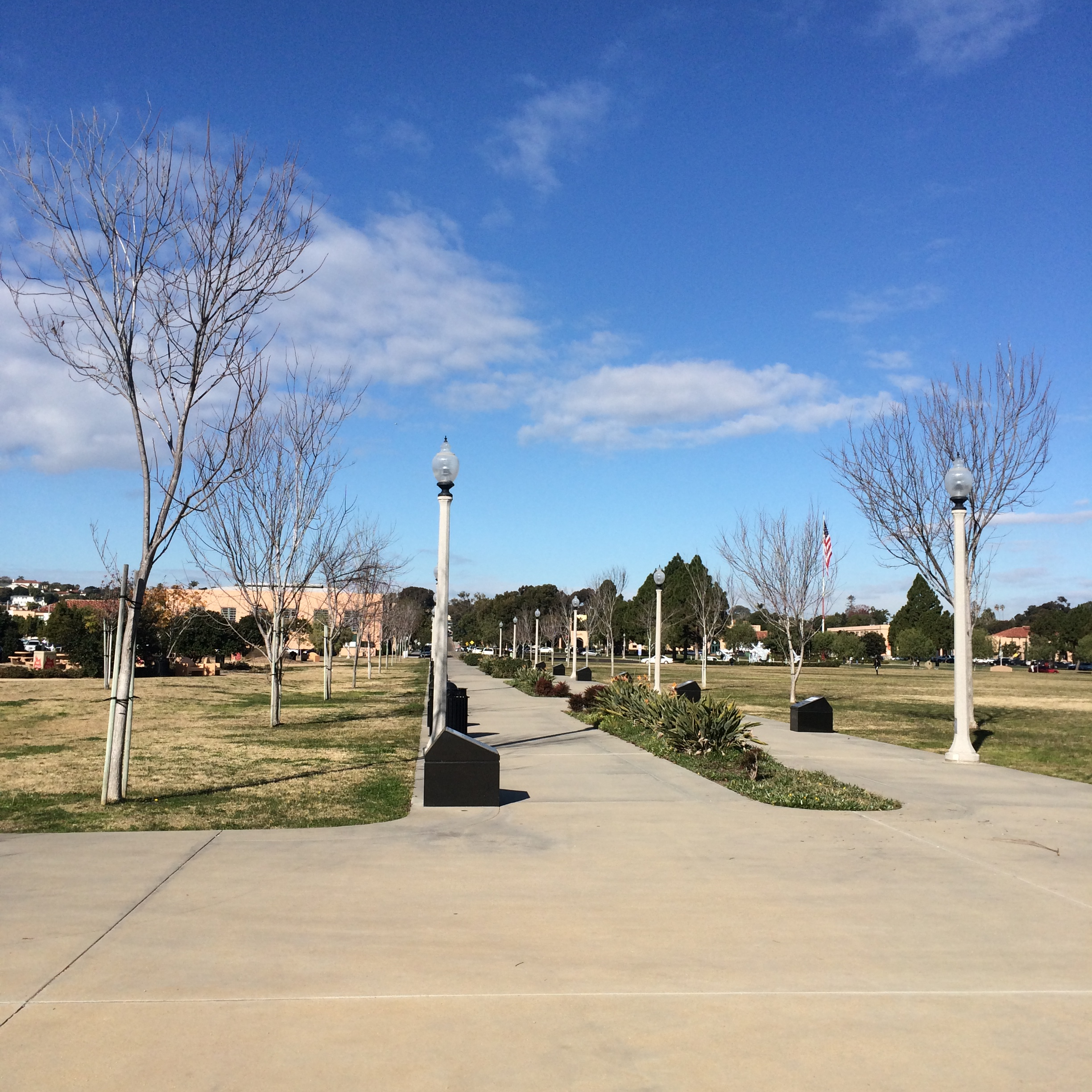
The WWII Submarine Veterans Memorial in December 2015

In 1995 the San Diego Chapter of United States Submarine Veterans of World War II voted unanimously to create a memorial to the 52 U.S. Navy submarines and 3,505 submariners lost in World War II. After 14 years of fundraising, planning and dealing with bureaucracy, the memorial was dedicated at Liberty Station.

The memorial honors the 52 submarines that were lost in World War II. It consists of 52 American Liberty Elm trees, 52 flags and 52 granite memorials to the ships and men who were lost. The project was driven by Doug Smay, whose father served in submarines during World War II. The memorial consists of two long sidewalks, flanked by the trees, flags and plaques. Ninety percent of the money for the project was raised through private donations.

== Park and open space ==
The park and open space area includes the golf course as well as a 46-acre (190,000 m^{2}) waterfront park with playground areas, a walking/jogging trail along the boat channel, and an athletic club. Due to its large open areas, Liberty Station is a popular setting for 5k walk/runs sponsored by local businesses and non-profit organizations. Seasonal kayak and paddle board rentals are offered as well.

Liberty Station has several fitness and therapy centers as well as gyms and athletic clubs, including Point Loma Sports Club, Yoga Six, F45. Club Pilates, and Breathe Degrees.
