= High Tech High North County =

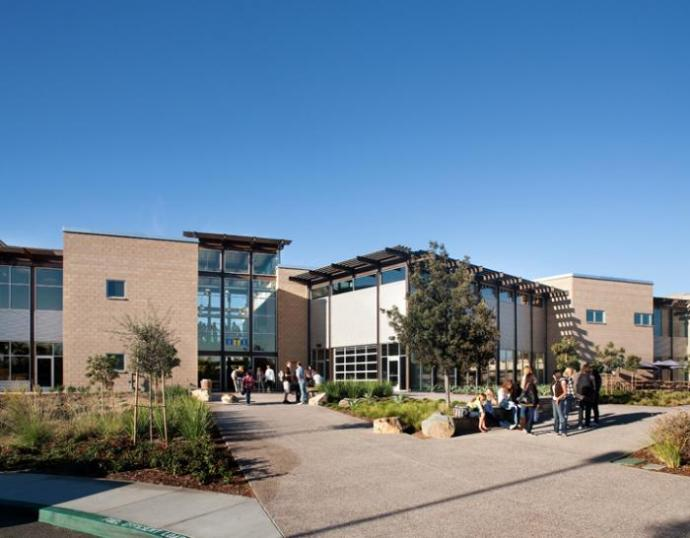

Location
- 1420 West San Marcos Blvd., San Marcos, California 92078; United States
- 33°7′54″N 117°12′8″W

Information
- Type: Charter
- Established: 2007
- School district: San Marcos Unified School District
- Dean: Aleida Rivera Gorgol
- Head of school: Joseph Davidson
- Staff: 44
- Grades: 9–12
- Colors: Blue, Grey, White, Yellow
- Athletics: Cross Country, Basketball, Soccer, Track and Field, Volleyball, Baseball, Tennis, Swim
- Mascot: Raptors
- Website: http://www.hightechhigh.org/schools/HTHNC/

High Tech High North County, also known as HTHNC, is a charter school located in San Marcos, California. It is a part of the High Tech High organization. Opening in 2007, with its initial class consisting of 150 freshmen, the school has since expanded to more than 550 students. The sophomore, junior, and senior classes were added when the original freshmen moved up. It is one of only two High Tech High schools to be built from the ground up with the other being High Tech High Chula Vista. The school follows the same type of personalized, college preparatory, project-based learning characterized at other High Tech High schools.

== Curriculum ==
All HTH students pursue a rigorous curriculum that provides the foundation for entry and success at the University of California and elsewhere, as well as success in the world of work. Schools articulate common expectations for learning that value 21st century skills, the integration of hands and minds, and the merging of academic disciplines. Assessment is performance-based: all students develop projects, solve problems, and present findings to community panels. All students are required to complete an academic internship, a substantial senior project, and a personal digital portfolio.

=== Internship ===
All High Tech High juniors are required to complete an internship in a local organization. The internship consists of an orientation followed by a five-week, full-time immersion at the work site, concluding with the intern's presentation of learning. Students receive credit for successfully completing their internship and related course work.

=== Digital Portfolios ===
HTHNC students are required to develop a digital portfolio (DP) that provides a comprehensive look at their work, learning and projects. Students update their digital portfolios each semester, documenting their learning over time. In addition to student digital portfolios, teachers maintain their own DPs that have current assignments, project overviews and class exhibitions of projects.

=== Intersession ===
Intersession takes place once a year, with its purpose being to immerse students out in the community; whether locally, nationally, or internationally. Intersession programs can range from community service, to homework study, to leisurely trips to international destinations such as Costa Rica, New Zealand, or Brazil. Many of the programs within intersession are not limited to just a single grade or class; and the combination of students of different grades enables them to bond with other students, and teachers.

=== Academic Seminar ===
Since the High Tech High Organization does not require physical education to be taken by students, an elective program is offered in substitution. Academic Seminar is a graded course taking place every Tuesday, Wednesday, and Thursday. It can range from a multimedia class to robotics, or a UC-approved course like Model United Nations. Teachers create and run each Academic Seminar.

== See also ==
- Education in the United States
