= High Tech High International =

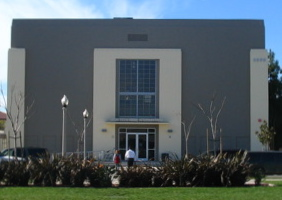

Location
- 2855 Farragut Road; San Diego, California 92106; United States
- 32°43′59″N 117°13′09″W

Information
- Type: Public
- Established: 2004
- School district: San Diego Unified School District
- Dean: Enrique Lugo
- Director: Jade White
- Grades: 9-12
- Athletics: Cross country, track & field, tennis, soccer, softball, swim, baseball, golf, basketball, volleyball, water polo, rugby
- Website: High Tech High International

High Tech High International, often referred to as HTHI, is a public charter high school in San Diego, California, United States. It has 391 students and 22 teachers. It is the third school in a program that attempts to change the way most students are taught in the United States and countries with similar schools. It is part of the High Tech High charter schools umbrella organization.

== History ==
High Tech High International was the second high school established in the High Tech High Village. Opened in 2004, in a building that was formerly the foundry/metal shop aboard the Naval Training Center, High Tech High International had as its goal to enlarge the perceptions of students on global policies.

It is currently under the same charter as its sister school, Gary and Jerri-Ann Jacobs High Tech High Charter School. This charter was granted by the California state board of education and allows for High Tech High to open 10 new charter schools in the state.

In 2011, HTHI was a finalist in the Race to the Top Commencement Challenge.
