= Rock Academy =

Location
- 2277 Rosecrans St., San Diego CA 92106
- 32.7359°N 117.2187°W

Information
- Type: Private Christian school
- Opened: 2002
- Grades: Preschool through 12
- Enrollment: 551 (as of 2024)
- Team name: Warriors
- Website: http://www.therockacademy.org

Rock Academy is a private Christian school in San Diego, California, serving students from preschool through grade 12. It is accredited by the Western Association of Schools and Colleges and the Association of Christian Schools International. It had 551 students in 2024.

== History ==
The academy was founded in 2002 under the auspices of Rock Church, an evangelical megachurch founded in 2000 by Miles McPherson. The school opened in September 2002 in space rented from a Baptist church in the Linda Vista neighborhood of San Diego. At its opening, the school had a student body of 38 students from kindergarten through 6th grade, as well as a preschool. Seventh and eighth grade students were added in 2003.

In 2007, the academy moved to its current home at 2277 Rosecrans Street, adjacent to Rock Church in Liberty Station and the historic former Naval Training Center San Diego in Point Loma. It then expanded to serve high school students.

== Activities ==
The academy participates in athletics at the Division 6 (small school) level. In 2015 the Warriors went 8-3 in their division (8-man football) and reached the CIF finals for the San Diego area.

== Controversy ==
In 2010, the academy and the church were targets of a class action lawsuit by local residents of Liberty Station, claiming that the presence of the school and church had harmed their property values.

In 2013, a civil lawsuit was filed alleging that four young girls had been molested by a teacher at Rock Academy in 2009–10. The teacher was fired in 2010. There was a police investigation of the allegations in 2012, but no criminal charges were filed.
