= Akuja de Garang =

British South Sudanese educator

- Born: 1970s Juba ,Sudan
- Citizenship: UK
- Education: SOAS
- Occupation: charity worker
- Employer: Mott MacDonald
- Known for: improving the education of girls in South Sudan
- Parent: Anna

Akuja Mading de Garang MBE (born 1970s) is a British South Sudanese educator. She left Sudan during the civil war and after moving to Egypt she was offered political asylum and citizenship in the UK. After studying in London she returned to South Sudan to lead a $70m programme to improve the education of girls in her home country.

== Life ==
Garang was born in Juba in 1975. She was very young when the Second Sudanese Civil War began in 1983. Her mother decided that her children needed to leave the country. Her father had died of cancer so they went temporarily to the capital of Sudan, Khartoum. There was prejudice against people from southern Sudan and her mother had a stroke, so they went to Egypt. They had relatives in the UK so they made an application to join them. Meanwhile, it was her education that allowed her to get office work to keep the family. In time they went to live in the south west of England in Bristol. When she was eighteen she became a British citizen.

Her studies took her to London and the School of Oriental and African Studies where she obtained a 2002 degree in African Studies and a 2003 master's degree, in Violence, Conflict and Development. She intended to return to South Sudan with her new qualifications and she re-entered the country of her birth in 2004.

In 2011, South Sudan became a country in its own right and she was there. She was employed by small companies as well as UNICEF and OCHA. After two years. she was employed by Girls’ Education South Sudan (GESS). Girls in South Sudan rarely had an education and poor families could not afford to keep their daughters but they could exchange them for a dowry. GESS planned to change that approach by offering grants to girls so that they could afford to study instead of marrying. Not just a few but 180,000 girls. In an interview Garang said that she hoped that her award would be seen as an ambition that other girls could aspire too. She has worked in Sudan, Kenya, Egypt, Israel/Palestine, the UK and South Sudan.

In the 2017 New Year Honours, Garang became a Member of the Most Excellent Order of the British Empire (MBE). Garang was identified as being pivotal in GESS's assistance to the girls in South Sudan. Nobody from South Sudan had been awarded an MBE before. She and Emma van der Meulen published Education development in a fragile environment: lessons from Girls’ Education South Sudan in the same month as her MBE was announced. The paper notes that the vast majority of girls in South Sudan are illiterate.

In 2019 she was nominated for the WISE prize for education. The award that year went to Larry Rosenstock. She led the send phase of the GESS programme with cost $70m over fiver years scheduled to complete in March 2024.
