= Gary E. Jacobs =

American businessman (born 1957)

- Born: 1957 (age 68–69)
- Education: University of California, San Diego (BA)
- Occupation: Businessman
- Known for: Founder of the Gary and Jerri-Ann Jacobs High Tech High Charter School; Owner of the Lake Elsinore Storm
- Spouse: Jerri-Ann Jacobs (m. 1983)
- Children: 4, including Sara
- Parent(s): Joan Klein Jacobs; Irwin M. Jacobs
- Relatives: Paul E. Jacobs (brother)

Gary E. Jacobs (born 1957) is an American businessman, founder of Gary and Jerri-Ann Jacobs High Tech High Charter School, and owner of the Lake Elsinore Storm. He is the father of U.S. Representative Sara Jacobs.

== Early life and education ==
Jacobs was born to a Jewish family, the son of Joan (née Klein) and Irwin M. Jacobs. His father was a co-founder of Linkabit and Qualcomm. He has three younger brothers: Hal, Paul and Jeff. In 1979, Jacobs earned a B.A. in Management Science from the University of California, San Diego.

== Career ==
After college, he worked for his father's companies, first Linkabit and then Qualcomm starting as a programmer, then as a software engineer, and in 1996, as a senior educational specialist working with schools to improve their math and science studies. He left Qualcomm in 2000 to focus on philanthropy.

Jacobs is the majority owner of the Class Advanced A, San Diego Padres affiliate, the Lake Elsinore Storm.

== Philanthropy ==
In 1999, he and his wife founded the Gary and Jerri-Ann Jacobs High Tech High Charter School in San Diego.

== Personal life ==
In 1983, he married Jerri-Ann Jacobs who is also Jewish. They have four children, including Sara.
