= Rock Church (San Diego) =

Coordinates: 32.73575°N 117.21860°W

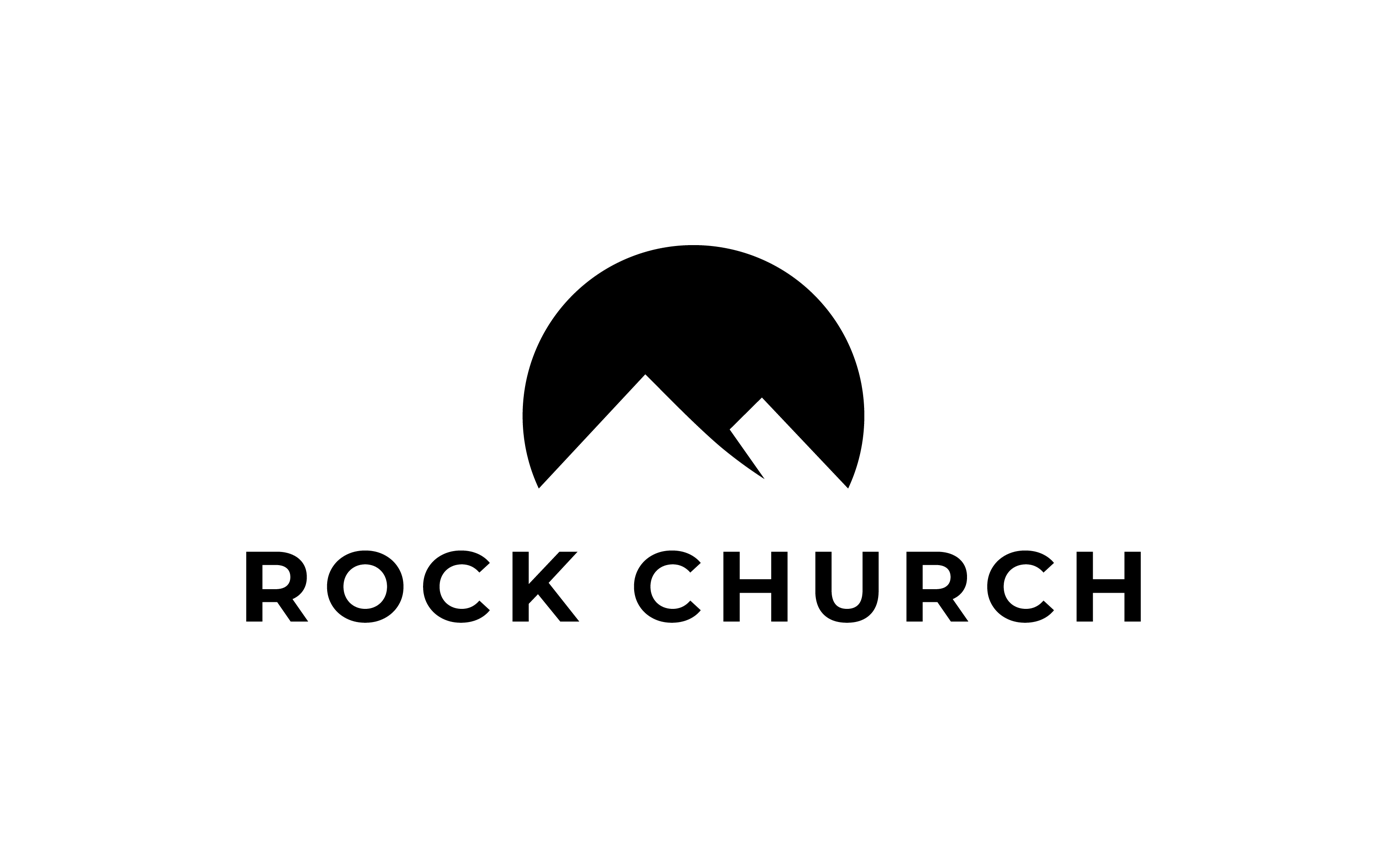
- Rock Church
- Location: 2277 Rosecrans Street, San Diego, California 92106
- Country: United States
- Denomination: Non-denominational
- Website: sdrock.com

History
- Founder: Miles McPherson

Rock Church is an evangelical megachurch with five campuses located in San Diego, California, specifically in Point Loma, San Marcos, El Cajon, Chula Vista, and City Heights. They also have a sixth campus in Oahu, Hawaii. Miles McPherson, a former NFL player, has served as senior pastor since he founded the church in 2000. With an average weekly attendance of more than 19,000 as of January 2016 at two weekly services at each campus, as well as live online streaming, the church is one of the largest in San Diego. Rock Church is affiliated with the Association of Related Churches.

== History ==
Rock Church held its first service at San Diego State University in 2000. Two years later, Rock Academy opened its doors to students. In 2005, the church began construction on their new building at Liberty Station and two years later, the new campus was open. In 2010 Rock Church North County opened, followed by the East County campus in 2013, San Ysidro campus in 2014, and City Heights in 2015. Rock Church also has a thrift store located in Point Loma.

== Point Loma campus ==
Rock Church, Point Loma campus

The Point Loma campus is 244,000 sq ft (22,700 m^{2}) building located in the historic Liberty Station. The building has been compared in size to Noah's Ark (443 feet long and 45 feet (14 m) high) and includes state-of-the art Christian education facilities, office space, and a 3,500 seat worship center. Because of the large size of the sanctuary, it is often used for high-profile funerals, such as those for police officers killed in the line of duty. The Point Loma campus also served as a shelter and resource center during the wildfires that spread across San Diego in 2007.

Adjacent to the church is Rock Academy, a private Christian school serving preschool through 12th grade with more than 400 students. The building was originally built in 1969 for the Navy as the Technical Training Building, Building 94, and was a 3-story reinforced concrete structure containing 170 classrooms, and a training galley on its first floor. During the renovations, the southern half of the structure was demolished to construct the worship center, with the remaining half of the structure undergoing a complete gut and full renovation, becoming Rock Academy.

== Community service ==
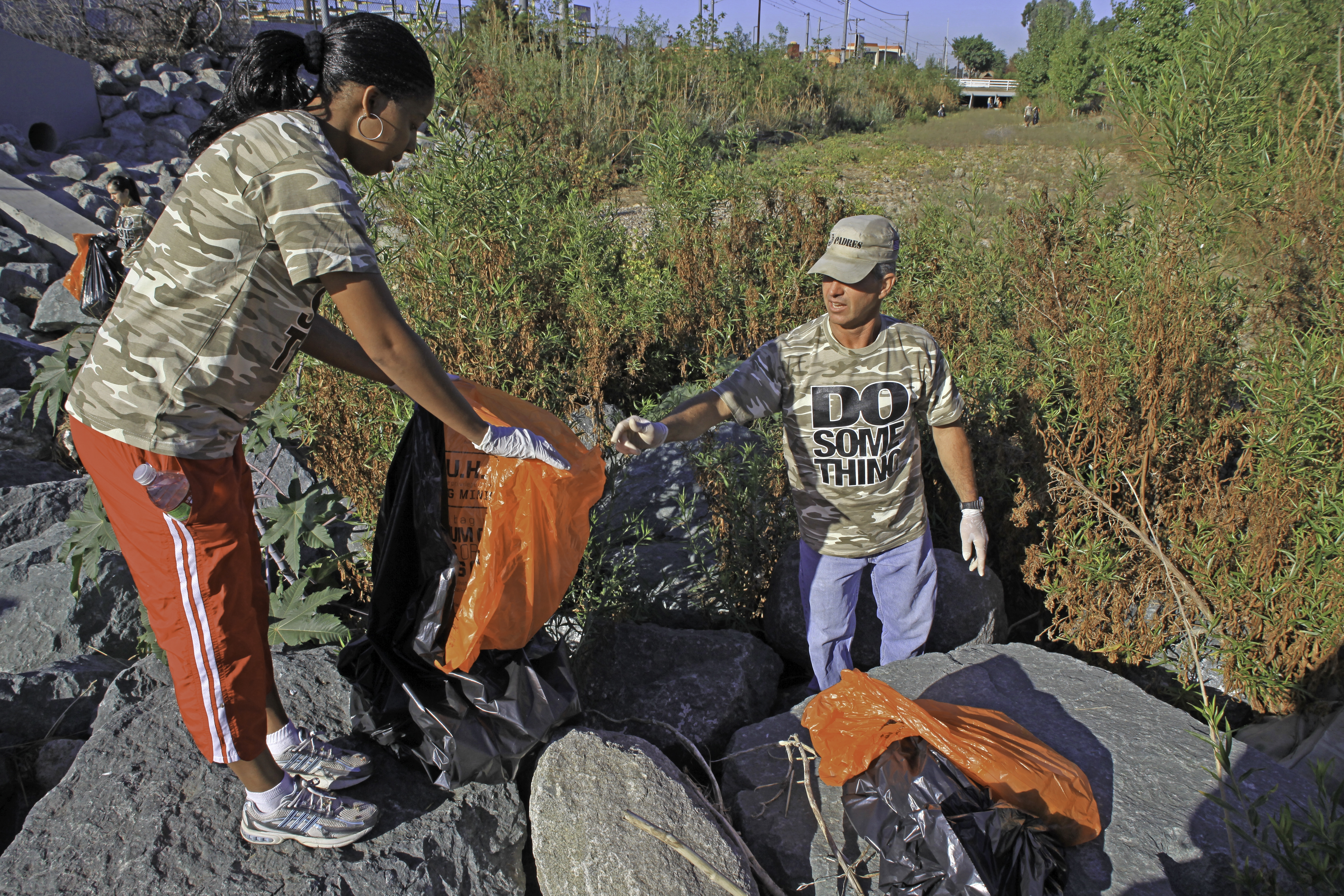
Rock Church members clean up trash as part of the church's Do Something event

McPherson encourages churchgoers to demonstrate the love of God through service in their communities. McPherson, who has published several books, released Do Something: Make Your Life Count in 2009, which focuses on helping individuals do something in their communities.

The church offers more than 150 external ministries for members to serve in. These include ministries that work in prisons, homeless shelters, strip clubs, hospital oncology wings, with military families, and more. In 2015, the church donated more than 220,000 hours of service on projects for the City of San Diego as designated by Mayor Kevin Faulconer and other community leaders, at an estimated value of $4 million.

The church mobilizes volunteers throughout the year to tackle beautification projects chosen by community leaders. In September 2011 and March 2012, volunteers cleaned up the Jackie Robinson YMCA and the Barrio Logan neighborhood. The church also hosts large charity events such as the annual December Toys for Joy event, which gives toys, groceries, clothing, and personal services to families in need.

== Conflicts ==
The church's current location in the middle of Point Loma has also led to conflicts with the neighborhood over traffic and parking issues, leading to numerous complaints and a multimillion-dollar class-action lawsuit against Liberty Station’s developer, Corky McMillin Companies. In May 2012, the San Diego County Grand Jury issued a report concluding that the church's location in an area designated for education use is inappropriate, and recommending that the city "Suspend the current Conditional Use Permit for the Rock Academy and Church pending a review for compliance and compatibility with the NTC Precise Plan and Local Coastal Program report (September 2001) and determine the church’s appropriateness for that area." However, in August, Mayor Jerry Sanders said he would not suspend the church's permit, describing the proposed suspension as "unreasonable".
