= High Tech High Village =

Charter schools in California, United States

Coordinates: 32°44′1″N 117°13′5″W

The High Tech High Village (colloquially known as The Village or High Tech Village) is a group of seven High Tech High charter schools in San Diego, California.

High Tech High Village
1 High Tech High
2 High Tech High Media Arts
3 High Tech High International
4 High Tech Middle
5 High Tech Middle Media Arts
6 Explorer Elementary
7 High Tech Elementary

== History ==
High Tech High was founded in 2000. It has since expanded into a "village" of multiple schools under the High Tech High umbrella.

== Schools ==
- High Tech High
- High Tech High Media Arts
- High Tech High International
- High Tech Middle
- High Tech Middle Media Arts
- Explorer Elementary
- High Tech Elementary
