= Sara Jacobs =

American politician (born 1989)

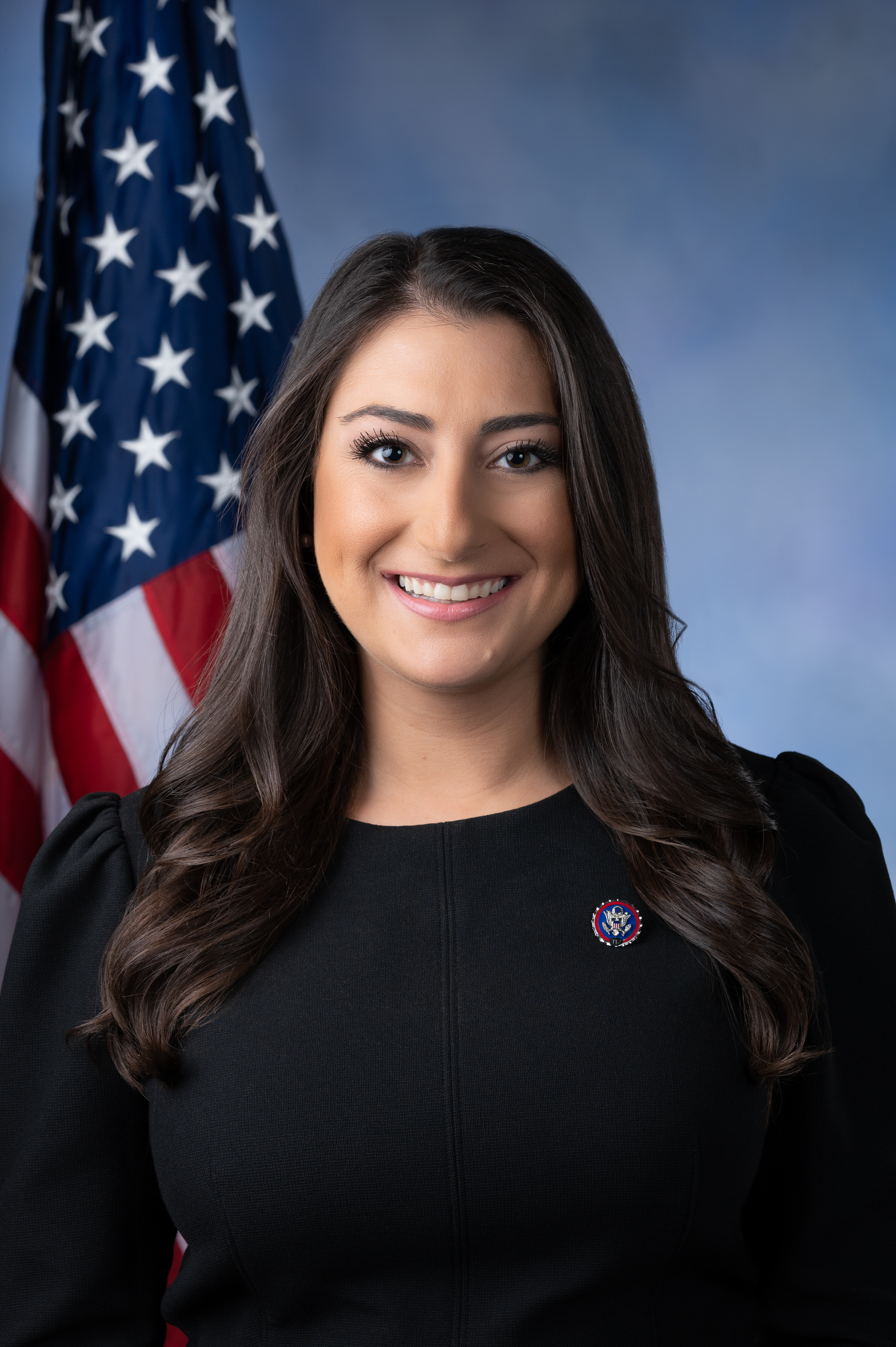
- Official portrait, 2021

Member of the U.S. House of Representatives from California
- Incumbent
- Assumed office January 3, 2021
- Preceded by: Susan Davis
- Constituency: 53rd district (2021–2023); 51st district (2023–present)

Personal details
- Born: Sara Josephine Jacobs; February 1, 1989 (age 37) Del Mar, California, U.S.
- Party: Democratic
- Domestic partner: Ammar Campa-Najjar
- Relatives: Gary E. Jacobs (father); Irwin M. Jacobs (grandfather); Paul E. Jacobs (uncle)
- Education: Columbia University (BA, MIA)
- Website: House website Campaign website
- Jacobs's voice Jacobs on the Respect for Marriage Act. Recorded December 8, 2022

Sara Josephine Jacobs (born February 1, 1989) is an American politician who has been the U.S. representative for California's 51st congressional district since 2023, previously representing the 53rd congressional district from 2021 to 2023. Her district includes central and eastern portions of San Diego, as well as eastern suburbs such as El Cajon, La Mesa, Spring Valley, and Lemon Grove. A member of the Democratic Party, she is the youngest member of California's congressional delegation. She was the caucus leadership representative for the 118th Congress, making her the youngest member of the Democratic House leadership.

== Early life and career ==
Jacobs was born in Del Mar, California, on February 1, 1989. Jacobs's grandfather is billionaire businessman Irwin M. Jacobs, a co-founder and former chairman of the semiconductor company Qualcomm. She graduated from Torrey Pines High School and Columbia University, earning a Bachelor of Arts in political science in 2011 and a Master of International Affairs in international relations in 2012.

After earning her master's degree, Jacobs worked for the United Nations and UNICEF. In February 2014, she began working as a contractor to the United States Department of State. She then served as a policy advisor on Hillary Clinton's 2016 presidential campaign. After the election, Jacobs formed a nonprofit called San Diego for Every Child: The Coalition to End Child Poverty.

== U.S. House of Representatives ==
=== Elections ===
==== 2018 ====
Jacobs ran as a Democrat in the 2018 elections for the United States House of Representatives in California's 49th congressional district. In the blanket primary election, she finished third, behind Diane Harkey and Mike Levin.

==== 2020 ====
In 2020, Jacobs ran in California's 53rd congressional district. She finished first in the top-two primary, and defeated San Diego City Council President Georgette Gómez in the November general election. She became the youngest United States Representative from California when she assumed office on January 3, 2021.

During her political campaigns, Jacobs has received significant funding from her grandfather. According to OpenSecrets, Jacobs was the 5th most self-funded candidate in the 2020 United States elections. She financed $6,921,255 to her campaign, constituting 90.32% of total campaign contributions.

==== 2022 ====
Following redistricting from the 2020 United States census, Jacobs ran in California's 51st congressional district. She defeated Republican Stan Caplan in the general election with around 62% of the vote.

==== 2024 ====
Jacobs ran for a third term in 2024, defeating the Republican nominee, El Cajon mayor Bill Wells, in the November election with 60.7% of the vote. The San Diego-based district was rated safely Democratic throughout the cycle.

==== 2026 ====
Jacobs is running for re-election in 2026. Although Proposition 50 redrew the state's congressional district map, the 51st district remained relatively unchanged by partisan lean.

=== Tenure ===
Jacobs was elected the caucus leadership representative for members in their first five terms in the 118th Congress, making her the youngest member of House Democratic leadership. In January 2026, House minority leader Hakeem Jeffries appointed her parliamentarian of the Democratic Steering and Policy Committee, a leadership post that is responsible for interpreting and applying House Democratic Caucus rules and for helping to shape the caucus's strategy. She is serving as a regional vice chair of the Democratic Congressional Campaign Committee for the 2026 election cycle.

In October 2026, Jacobs sent a "Dear Colleague" letter asking for support from other Democratic House members to become vice-chair of the House Democratic Caucus in the next congress.

==== Armed Services ====
Much of Jacobs's defense work has focused on artificial intelligence. She successfully added language to the 2025 National Defense Authorization Act (NDAA) requiring a human to remain "in the loop" for any launch of nuclear weapons, barring AI systems from launching weapons autonomously. She has worked to secure provisions that support military families, including expanded child care and fertility services for them.

==== Domestic legislation ====
In 2022, Jacobs authored the My Body, My Data Act to limit the collection of personal reproductive health data, such as period-tracking apps. She reintroduced it in 2023 and 2025 with Senators Ron Wyden and Mazie Hirono. In 2022, Jacobs introduced a bill to rename the Andrew Jackson Post Office in Rolando after her predecessor Susan A. Davis. Signed into law on December 27, 2022, a ceremony to install a new plaque with Davis' name was held on July 7, 2023. The Andrew Jackson signage remains on the front of the building.

=== Committee assignments ===
For the 119th Congress:

- Committee on Armed Services
  - Subcommittee on Intelligence and Special Operations
  - Subcommittee on Military Personnel
- Committee on Foreign Affairs
  - Subcommittee on Africa (Ranking Member)
  - Subcommittee on the Western Hemisphere

=== Caucus memberships ===
- Congressional Equality Caucus (Vice Chair)
- Black Maternal Health Caucus
- Congressional Caucus for the Equal Rights Amendment
- New Democrat Coalition
- Congressional LGBTQ+ Equality Caucus
- Congressional Progressive Caucus
- Medicare for All Caucus
- Future Forum

== Political positions ==
Jacobs is a member of both the Congressional Progressive Caucus and the New Democrat Coalition. A FiveThirtyEight analysis found that she voted with President Joe Biden's stated position 100% of the time in the 117th Congress.

=== Abortion rights ===
In 2022, Jacobs authored legislation to regulate the collection of personal reproductive health data, as in period-tracking apps. Mazie Hirono and Ron Wyden introduced a version in the U.S. Senate. Along with 16 other members of Congress, Jacobs was arrested at a demonstration in support of abortion rights outside the United States Supreme Court Building on July 19, 2022. On the one-year anniversary of the Dobbs v. Jackson Women's Health Organization decision, Jacobs wrote an op-ed for MSNBC.com calling for passage of her My Body, My Data Act, which would create a national standard to protect reproductive and sexual health data.

=== Foreign policy ===
==== Africa ====
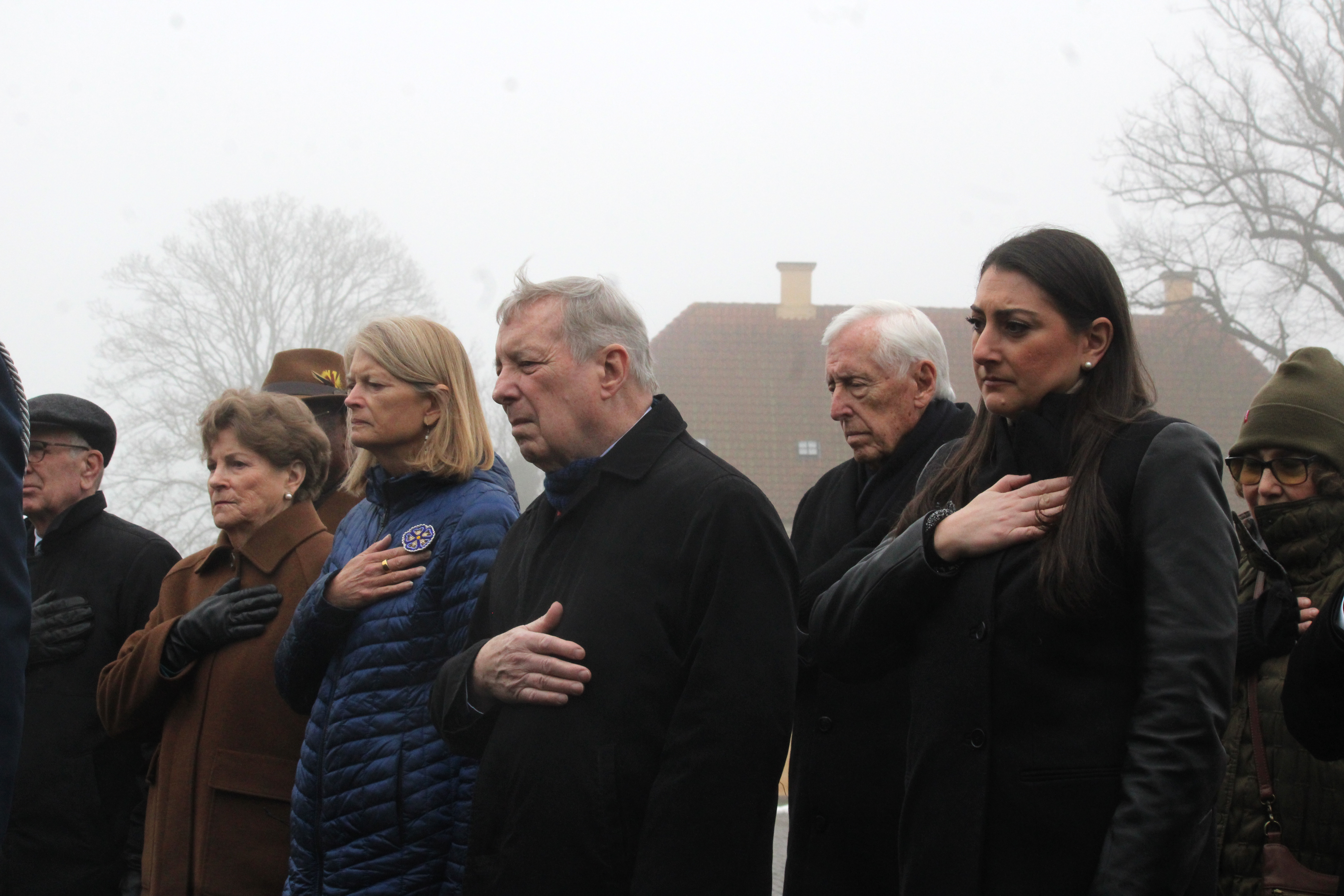
Jacobs wth other U.S. politicians at Kastellet in Copenhagen, Denmark in support of the country during the Greenland crisis, January 2026

Shortly before President Joe Biden left office, his administration determined that the Sudanese paramilitary Rapid Support Forces (RSF) militia was committing genocide and accused the Sudanese Armed Forces (SAF) of using chemical weapons in the Sudanese Civil War. As a member of the House Foreign Affairs Committee and the Subcommittee on Africa, Jacobs supported bill S.935, which seeks to block arms exports and sales from the United States to the United Arab Emirates (UAE) until it is certified that the UAE is not providing material support to the RSF in Sudan.

Jacobs visited a refugee camp in Sudan in March 2024, reporting her observation of the extensive trauma endured by children in Sudan, under the conflict. As a result of this trip, she stated the US is morally obligated to take measures and stop the selling arms to the UAE which are being sold to arm the RSF militias. In a December 2022 Foreign Policy article, Jacobs criticized the United States' counterterrorism strategy in Africa, writing that good governance is needed in Africa instead of guns. She was among the first members of Congress to visit Sudanese refugees at the border.

==== Israel and Gaza ====
On January 15, 2025, Jacobs responded to the January ceasefire agreement by stating that "we’re in desperate need to repair the damage done to international norms and the United States’ credibility. We also need to ensure that all parties respect and uphold this agreement in good faith. I will keep working until all the hostages are released, a permanent ceasefire is implemented, humanitarian assistance is readily available, and Gazans have rebuilt and have self-determination"

On April 5, 2024, Jacobs joined 39 Democrats in a call for Biden to stop the transfer of US weapons to Israel during the Gaza war. Jacobs signed a letter with Nancy Pelosi and including Representatives Cori Bush, Barbara Lee, Jamaal Bowman, Ilhan Omar, Rashida Tlaib and Alexandria Ocasio-Cortez. Two weeks later, she voted in favor of a $26 billion bill that provided both humanitarian aid to Gaza and military aid to Israel. She responded to criticism about signing this bill by stating: "While I’m deeply concerned about further military assistance to Israel, I couldn’t in good conscience vote against this lifesaving humanitarian assistance.”

On November 18, 2023, Jacobs called for a ceasefire in the Gaza war and an end to Israel's blockade of the Gaza Strip, saying "It is time for a bilateral ceasefire — to immediately release the hostages; to establish humanitarian access and allow fuel, food, water and medical care into Gaza; and to end the bombardment of millions of Palestinian civilians." In November 2023, Jacobs introduced a measure to censure Congressman Brian Mast after Mast stated that Palestinian children killed by Israel were not innocent civilians, however the measure was withdrawn by Democratic leadership.

==== Ukraine ====
In 2022, as tensions with Russia escalated in the leadup to the Russo-Ukrainian war, Jacobs was among a number of House members that traveled to Ukraine to talk about U.S. support for their position. On July 6, 2023, US President Joe Biden authorized the provision of cluster munitions to Ukraine in support of a Ukrainian counter-offensive against Russian forces in Russian-occupied southeastern Ukraine. Jacobs opposed the Biden administration's decision to supply cluster munitions to Ukraine.

=== Democratic House leadership ===
In 2022, Jacobs said she supported Nancy Pelosi remaining Democratic leader within the House.

=== Tax policy ===
Jacobs wishes to repeal the tax cuts for the wealthy in the Tax Cuts and Jobs Act. She wants "to increase the highest marginal tax rate and ensure capital gains rates match that, close loopholes in our tax code, and make sure everyone, including corporations, pays their fair share".

=== Health care ===
Jacobs supports Medicare for All. Jacobs called the Trump administration's response to COVID-19 "horribly mishandled". She wants to hold businesses and individuals accountable for price gouging related to personal protective equipment and health care supplies during the pandemic.

=== Families and children ===
Jacobs supports the Child Care is Essential Act, which aims to pay child care workers a good wage and helps pay for child care for working families. Jacobs co-leads the Child Care for Every Community Act, which aims to create a federally-funded and locally-run network of child care centers.

=== Immigration ===
Jacobs supports including a provision to grant citizenship for undocumented immigrants residing in the U.S., and passing the DREAM Act. She supports increasing funding for the immigration-related court system, and reducing backlogs. She supports modernizing border security and improving transit times. She opposes the Trump administration family separation policy, and wants to end funding on privatized detention facilities. Jacobs wants the U.S. to accept at least 95,000 refugees annually and protect individuals with Temporary Protected Status.

=== LGBTQ rights ===
Jacobs is a vice chair of the Congressional Equality Caucus and co-chairs its Transgender Equality Task Force. She has spoken publicly about her transgender sibling in advocating for LGBTQ rights.

=== Guns ===
Jacobs supports stricter gun laws, including an assault weapons ban and expanded background checks, and has said she supports closing other loopholes around gun ownership for dangerous people.

=== Environment ===
Jacobs calls climate change "one of the biggest threats facing humanity". She says she wants a zero-carbon, clean energy economy by 2030.

== Personal life ==
Jacobs lives in the Kensington neighborhood of San Diego. She is Jewish.

With an estimated net worth of $76 million, Jacobs is one of the wealthiest members of Congress.

She has been in a relationship with Ammar Campa-Najjar (a former Democratic candidate for a neighboring congressional district) since 2019.

== Electoral history ==
2020 United States House of Representatives elections in California
Party	Candidate	Votes	%
Democratic	Sara Jacobs	192,897	59.5
Democratic	Georgette Gómez	131,349	40.5
Total votes		324,246	100.0
Democratic hold			

2022 United States House of Representatives elections in California
Party	Candidate	Votes	%
Democratic	Sara Jacobs (Incumbent)	144,186	61.9
Republican	Stan Caplan	88,886	38.1
Total votes		233,072	100.0
Democratic hold			

2024 United States House of Representatives elections in California
Primary election
Party	Candidate	Votes	%
Democratic	Sara Jacobs (incumbent)	90,901	57.4
Republican	Bill Wells	61,923	39.1
No party preference	Stan Caplan	3,164	2.0
No party preference	Hilaire Fuji Shioura	2,496	1.6
Total votes		158,484	100.0
General election
Democratic	Sara Jacobs (incumbent)	198,835	60.7
Republican	Bill Wells	128,749	39.3
Total votes		327,584	100.0
Democratic hold			

== See also ==
- List of Jewish members of the United States Congress
- Women in the United States House of Representatives

U.S. House of Representatives
Preceded by Susan Davis	Member of the U.S. House of Representatives from California's 53rd congressional district 2021–2023	Constituency abolished
Preceded by Juan Vargas	Member of the U.S. House of Representatives from California's 51st congressional district 2023–present	Incumbent
U.S. order of precedence (ceremonial)
Preceded by Ronny Jackson	United States representatives by seniority 257th	Succeeded by Young Kim
