= High Tech High Media Arts =

Location
- 2230 Truxtun Road; San Diego, California 92106; United States
- 32°44′3″N 117°13′10″W

Information
- Type: Public
- Established: 2005
- School district: San Diego Unified School District
- Dean: Ray Trinidad
- Head of school: Paul Yumbla
- Faculty: 31
- Grades: 9-12
- Enrollment: 400 (2016-17)
- Color
- Athletics conference: Frontier League, CIF
- Sports: Cross Country, Volleyball, Tennis, Water Polo, Basketball, Soccer, Track and Field, Baseball, Golf, Swimming, Softball
- Team name: Storm
- Website: High Tech High Media Arts

High Tech High Media Arts (HTHMA) is a public charter high school in San Diego, California, United States.

== Description ==
The school uses project-based learning to teach students. HTHMA teaches grades 9-12 and has approximately 400 students.

It is the fourth school in the High Tech High charter schools coalition of schools, which attempts to change some of the ways most students in the United States are taught.

=== Teachers ===
HTH schools seek teachers with relevant industry experience. For example, humanities teachers have published professionally or attended a professional school such as law school, occasionally medical school. Science teachers are recruited from industries such as engineering. Academic teachers are recruited from many major colleges.

== History ==
High Tech High was originally conceived by a group of about 40 civic and high tech industry leaders in San Diego, assembled by the Economic Development Corporation and the Business Roundtable, who met regularly from 1996 to 1998 to discuss the challenge of finding qualified individuals for the high-tech work force. In particular, members were concerned about the "digital divide" that resulted in low numbers of women and ethnic minority groups entering the fields of math, science, and engineering. Gary Jacobs, Director of Education Programs at Qualcomm, and Kay Davis, Director of the Business Roundtable, were key participants in these discussions.

In late 1998 the group voted to start a charter school and engaged Larry Rosenstock, then President of Price Charities in San Diego, as the founding principal. The founding group was clear about its intent: to create a school where students would be passionate about learning and would acquire the basic skills of work and citizenship. Rosenstock, a former carpentry teacher, lawyer, and high school principal who had recently directed the U.S. Department of Education's New Urban High School project, brought a vision and a sense of the design principles by which this mission might be accomplished.

From January 1999 to the opening of the Gary & Jerri-Ann Jacobs High Tech High in September 2000, Rosenstock and the founding group, led by Gary Jacobs, worked in tandem. Rosenstock located a site, prepared the charter application, hired staff, and oversaw the development of the program, while Jacobs and the business community took the lead in addressing issues of financing and facilities development.

== See also ==
- Schools in San Diego
