= Miles McPherson =

American football player and pastor (born 1960)

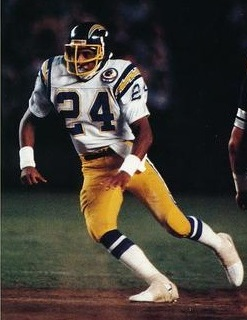
- McPherson in 1984

No. 24
- Position: Cornerback

Personal information
- Born: March 30, 1960 (age 66); Queens, New York, U.S.
- Listed height: 5 ft 11 in (1.80 m)
- Listed weight: 184 lb (83 kg)

Career information
- High school: Malverne (Malverne, New York)
- College: New Haven
- NFL draft: 1982: 10th round, 256 (by the Los Angeles Rams)th overall pick

Career history
- Los Angeles Rams (1982)*; San Diego Chargers (1982–1985)
- * Offseason or practice squad member only

Career NFL statistics
- Interceptions: 2
- Fumble recoveries: 2
- Sacks: 1
- Stats at Pro Football Reference

Miles Gregory McPherson (born March 30, 1960) is the pastor of Rock Church in San Diego, a motivational speaker, and a former professional National Football League (NFL) player.

== History ==
McPherson grew up on Long Island. He attended the University of New Haven, where he majored in engineering. McPherson was the university's first player to achieve All-American honors in football and be drafted into the NFL. He was originally drafted in the tenth round of the 1982 NFL Draft by the Los Angeles Rams; he was cut and went on to play defensive back for the San Diego Chargers.

After battling a drug problem, McPherson became a born again Christian in 1984, and began participating in religious outreach programs. In September 1986, he retired from football; the next week, he enrolled in Azusa Pacific University's School of Theology. He received his Master of Divinity degree in 1991.

In 1992, McPherson founded "Miles Ahead", a non-profit international evangelical organization.

In 2000, McPherson founded Rock Church. As of 2009, more than 12,000 attend one of the Rock's five weekend services.

McPherson spoke at the 2008 Republican National Convention. McPherson has appeared on Good Morning America, Larry King Live, The O'Reilly Factor, and other national news networks.

== Bibliography ==
McPherson is the author of several books, including Do Something! Make Your Life Count. and God In The Mirror: Discovering Who You Were Created to Be. He earned an Emmy Award in 2007 as the producer of Master Meth, a documentary on methamphetamine.

== Family ==
McPherson and his wife Debbie have three children. His younger brother Don McPherson is also a former NFL player.
