= Irwin M. Jacobs =

American businessman, founder of Qualcomm (born 1933)

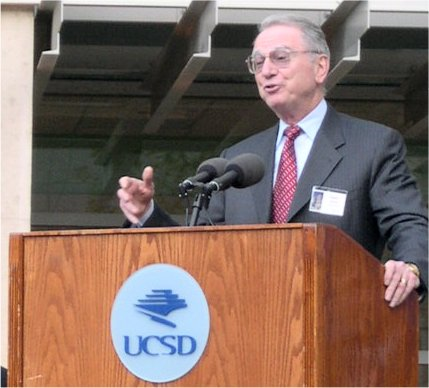
- Jacobs in 2005
- Born: Irwin Mark Jacobs; October 18, 1933 (age 93); New Bedford, Massachusetts, U.S.
- Education: Cornell University (BSc); Massachusetts Institute of Technology (MSc, DSc)
- Occupations: Engineer, businessman
- Known for: Co-founder of Qualcomm
- Spouse: Joan Klein (m. 1954, died 2024)
- Children: Gary, Hal, Paul, Jeff
- Relatives: Sara Jacobs (granddaughter)
- Awards: Marconi Prize; IEEE Medal of Honor; IEEE Alexander Graham Bell Medal; IEEE/RSE Wolfson James Clerk Maxwell Medal; National Medal of Technology and Innovation; Benjamin Franklin Medal; IET Mountbatten Medal

Irwin Mark Jacobs (born October 18, 1933) is an American electrical engineer and businessman. He is a co-founder and former chairman of Qualcomm, and chair of the board of trustees of the Salk Institute for Biological Studies. As of 2019, Jacobs had an estimated net worth of $1.2 billion.

== Early life and education ==
Jacobs was born to a Jewish family in New Bedford, Massachusetts. He earned his Bachelor of Science in electrical engineering from Cornell University in 1956, and his Master of Science and Doctor of Science degrees in electrical engineering and computer science from the Massachusetts Institute of Technology (MIT) in 1957 and 1959, respectively. His doctoral advisor was Edward Arthurs. He is a member of Sigma Alpha Mu fraternity.

== Career ==
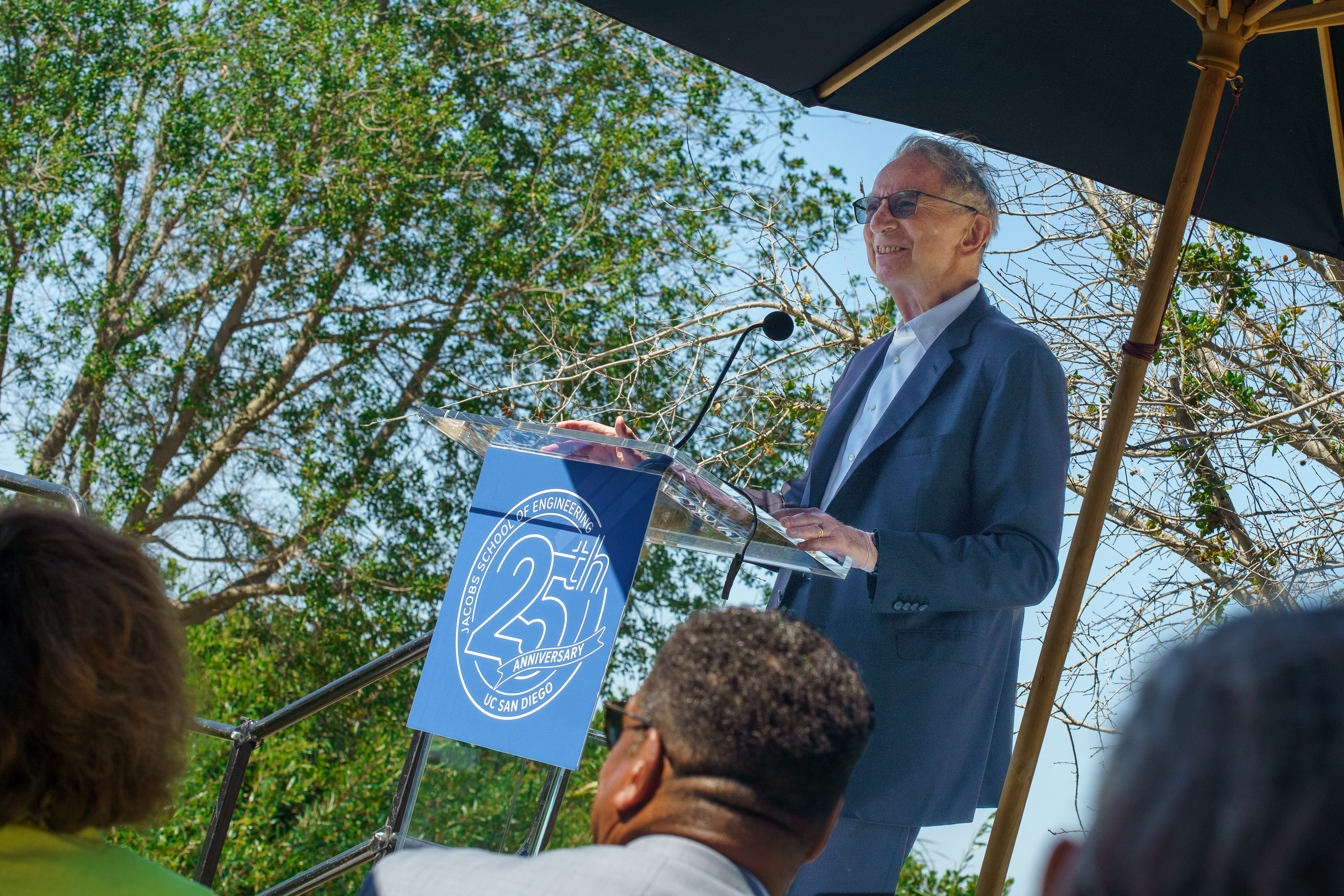
Jacobs speaking at UC San Diego in 2023

Jacobs was assistant and associate professor of electrical engineering at MIT from 1959 to 1966 and professor of computer science and engineering at the University of California, San Diego (UCSD) from 1966 to 1972. With John Wozencraft, he co-authored a textbook entitled Principles of Communication Engineering in 1965, which is still in use today. UCSD's Jacobs School of Engineering is named for him and his wife.

In 1968, Jacobs co-founded Linkabit Corporation with Andrew Viterbi to develop satellite encryption devices. That company merged with M/A-COM, Inc. in 1980, becoming M/A-COM Linkabit.

In 1985, Jacobs went on to co-found Qualcomm Inc. along with Viterbi, Harvey White, Adelia Coffman, Andrew Cohen, Klein Gilhousen, and Franklin Antonio. Qualcomm developed the OmniTRACS system that was deemed one of the world's most "technologically advanced two-way mobile satellite communications and tracking systems". He pioneered these systems which use the communication bandwidth more efficiently than the older fixed time-sliced TDMA technology. Its Code-Division Multiple Access (CDMA) has been adopted as one of two digital standards (the other being Global System for Mobile Communications [GSM]) used in the next generation of cellular telephones in North America at the time. Jacobs announced in March 2009 that he had stepped down as chairman of Qualcomm and that Paul E. Jacobs, his son, would succeed him.

== Affiliations ==
Jacobs was elected a member of the National Academy of Engineering in 1982 for contributions to communication theory and practice, and leadership in high-technology product development. He is also a Fellow of the IEEE. He is a member of the Inter-American Dialogue. He is a chairman on the Salk Institute for Biological Studies, and is on the international advisory board for the Israel Institute of Technology. He is also on the advisory board for the School of Economics and Management at Tsinghua University in Beijing, and on the board of directors of the Pacific Council on International Policy in Los Angeles.

== Awards and honors ==
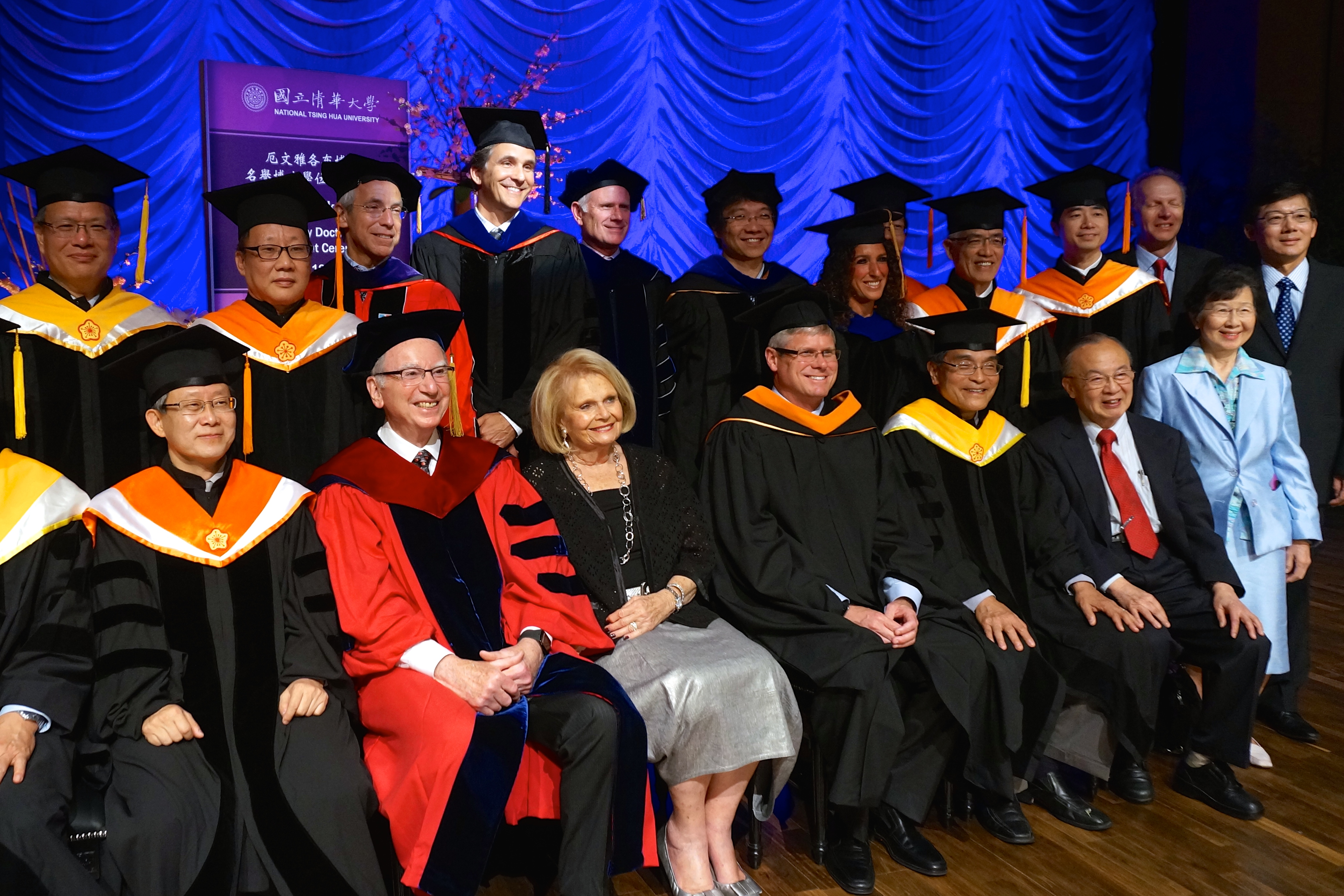
Irwin Jacobs receiving his honorary doctorate of engineering (honoris causa) from National Tsing Hua University, Taiwan, 2014

In 1980, Jacobs was the co-recipient, with Andrew J. Viterbi, the 1980 American Institute of Aeronautics and Astronautics (AIAA) biannual award. In 1992, Jacobs was awarded the Entrepreneur of the Year Award in High Technology by the Institute of American Entrepreneurs, and in May 1993, he was awarded the American Electronics Association (AEA) "Inventing America's Future" award.

In 1994, for his development of CDMA, Jacobs was awarded the National Medal of Technology and Innovation.

In 1994, he was also awarded the "Cornell University Entrepreneur of the Year" Award.

In 1995, Jacobs won the IEEE Alexander Graham Bell Medal – For outstanding contributions to telecommunications, including leadership, theory, practice, and product development.

In 2000, Jacobs was inducted into the Wireless Hall of Fame for his role in the cellular industry.

In 2001, Jacobs was awarded the Bower Award for Business Leadership in 2001.

In 2004, Jacobs and his wife Joan Jacobs are contributors to public arts and education in San Diego. For this, Jacobs was awarded the Woodrow Wilson Award for Corporate Citizenship in 2004.

In 2005, Jacobs delivered the 2005 commencement speech at MIT, and the 2008 commencement speech at the Jacobs School of Engineering.

In 2007, Jacobs and Viterbi received the 2007 IEEE/RSE Wolfson James Clerk Maxwell Award, for "fundamental contributions, innovation, and leadership that enabled the growth of wireless telecommunications".

In 2009, he was named a Fellow of AAAS (American Association for the Advancement of Science).

In 2011, he received the Marconi Prize together with Jack Wolf.

In 2011, he was named a Marconi Prize recipient and Marconi Fellow.

In 2011, Jacobs was inducted into the International Air & Space Hall of Fame at the San Diego Air & Space Museum.

In 2012, Jacobs was named the W. P. Carey School of Business Dean's Council of 100 Executive of the Year.

In 2013, Jacobs was inducted into the National Inventors Hall of Fame.

In 2013, he received the Medal of Honor from the Institute of Electrical and Electronics Engineers (IEEE), which is the highest honor an engineer can receive from his or her peers. The IEEE said he was receiving the award not just for his innovations but for "the ability to translate innovation into industry applications, time after time after time."

In November 2013, he was conferred the title of "Distinguished Honor Chair Professor" of National Tsing Hua University, Taiwan.

In 2013, he was elected to the American Philosophical Society.

In August and October 2014, Jacobs was awarded honorary doctorates by National Tsing Hua University, Taiwan, and Hong Kong Polytechnic University.

In 2014, Jacobs was elected to the Computer History Museum as a Fellow – for "his pioneering work in digital mobile telephony, data and communications, and technology".

In 2015, Jacobs received the Carnegie Medal of Philanthropy.

In 2017, Jacobs received an honorary Doctor of Engineering and Technology degree from Yale University.

In 2017, Jacobs and Viterbi received the IEEE Milestone Award for their CDMA and spread spectrum development that drives the mobile industry.

In February 2018, he was appointed an honorary advisor to the president of National Tsing Hua University, Taiwan.

In March 2018, he was named the winner of IMEC Lifetime of Innovation Award.

In July 2019, he was awarded an honorary doctorate by the University of York, UK.

In October 2019, he received the IET Mountbatten Medal in London.

== Philanthropy ==
As the co-founder and chairman of Qualcomm, Jacobs has contributed hundreds of millions of dollars to the field of education through donations and grants to several schools and organizations. His donations have gone mostly towards fellowships and scholarships for students in the fields of engineering and computer science, as well as the arts, and are focused in the San Diego area. The San Diego Union-Tribune in 2011 dubbed him the "Philanthropist in Chief".

As of September 2009, Jacobs had donated a total of $31 million to his post graduate degrees school, the Massachusetts Institute of Technology. He had donated $15 million and another $110 million to the University of California, San Diego where he was a professor of computer science and engineering for several years. Additionally, he has donated $62 million total to the American Society for Technion, his alma mater Cornell University, and KPBS Radio and Television. His KPBS donation was in the sum of $1 million, and the multi-year gift is designed to strengthen the station's local journalism and news collaboration with NPR. The Jacobs have donated funds to build studios for KPBS and have supported the station for decades. In 2010, he funded an engineering study on how to fulfill a proposal to remove automobiles from the Plaza de Panama in San Diego's Balboa Park and agreed to chair a committee to study the proposal and develop private funding for it.

Irwin and Joan Jacobs donated $5 million in 2002 to the Museum of Contemporary Art San Diego downtown location for the renovation of the former train station baggage building which was named in their honor.

Jacobs has pledged $120 million for the San Diego Symphony, a similar amount for the Jacobs School of Engineering at the University of California, San Diego, $100 million for UCSD's future specialty hospital and $20 million to replace the central library in downtown San Diego. Also in 2005, the Joan and Irwin Jacobs Center for the La Jolla Playhouse was named after Jacobs and his wife in honor of their philanthropic contributions towards the institution's development. In April 2013, the Jacobs donated $133 million to the joint Cornell Tech campus development on Roosevelt Island in New York City.

The Joan and Irwin Jacobs TIX Institute at National Tsing Hua University, Taiwan, was sponsored by Jacobs with the mission of encouraging innovation and entrepreneurship.

The American Civil Liberties Union Foundation announced in January 2022 that it was renaming its list of pending United States Supreme Court cases the "Joan and Irwin Jacobs Supreme Court Docket" in honor of the couple's $20 million gift, the largest one-time endowment gift in the organization's history.

=== The Giving Pledge ===
In August 2010, Irwin and Joan Jacobs joined the Giving Pledge, pledging to give away most of their fortune to philanthropy.

== Personal life ==
In 1954, Jacobs married Joan Klein. The couple resided in La Jolla, California, and had four sons. Their son Paul E. Jacobs succeeded Irwin as CEO of Qualcomm until stepping down in March 2014. Their eldest son, Gary E. Jacobs, is the head of the board of the Gary and Jerri-Ann Jacobs High Tech High Charter School. His granddaughter, Sara Jacobs, a Democratic politician, is the representative for California's 51st congressional district. During her political campaigns, she received significant funding from her grandfather.

== Notes ==
Awards
Preceded by Hiroshi Inose	IEEE Alexander Graham Bell Medal; 1995	Succeeded by Tadahiro Sekimoto
Preceded by (First)	IEEE/RSE Wolfson James Clerk Maxwell Award; 2007	Succeeded by Tim Berners-Lee
Preceded by John L. Hennessy	IEEE Medal of Honor; 2013	Succeeded by B. Jayant Baliga
