= General Instrument (disambiguation) =

General Instrument or General Instruments is part of a company name. It may refer to:

- General Instrument Inc.: Founded in 1939, in Montgomery County, Pennsylvania, United States; it was a manufacturer of diodes, transistors, and logic ICs
  - General Instrument Corp.: The largest split-up portions from its predecessor, it was known as NextLevel Systems Inc., before 1998
- Texas Instruments Inc., whose original chosen name in 1951 was General Instruments Inc, before realizing that it was a name conflict
- On December 19, 2012, Arris International announced that it would acquire Motorola Mobility's home unit (the former General Instrument company) from Google
