= Linkabit =

American technology company

Linkabit Corporation was an American computer networking company founded in 1968 by Irwin M. Jacobs, Andrew Viterbi and Leonard Kleinrock. Linkabit alumni have created a large number of technology companies, most notably, Qualcomm.

After a series of acquisitions and mergers from 1980 through 2019, Linkabit is now a division of L3Harris Technologies.

== Corporate history ==
Linkabit Corporation was formed in mid-1968 in Los Angeles by Irwin M. Jacobs of UCSD and Andrew Viterbi and Leonard Kleinrock of UCLA. Kleinrock soon left, instead contributing to the early development of the ARPANET.

The firm pioneered a series of digital communications technologies, particularly for satellite communications. In the 1970s, Linkabit designed and managed SATNET for DARPA. From 1969-1976, Viterbi, Jacobs and Linkabit employees applied coding theory to increase the signal strength and reliability of NASA communications for its Voyager interplanetary space probes.

In 1974, the company designed and contracted for the production of its own proprietary microprocessor, the Linkabit Microprocessor (LMP). In the late 1970s and early 1980s, it used the LMP to develop a series of defense satellite communications terminals, including the Command Post Modem/Processor (CPM/P), Dual Modem and Tri Modem.

The sale of Linkabit to M/A-COM was announced in November 1979, and was completed in August 1980 for a total price of $25 million. The Linkabit operation continued under M/A-COM for the first part of the 1980s. In November 1980, Linkabit was still doing testing for SATNET. VideoCipher, an analog scrambling system for television, was developed by the Linkabit division of M/A-COM in 1983. The first IETF meeting in January, 1986, was hosted by M/A-COM at its San Diego Linkabit facilities.

However, Jacobs and Viterbi, who had stayed with M/A-COM following the sale, left in April 1985. M/A-COM then sold off Linkabit piecemeal, starting with the 1986 sale of the VideoCipher division to General Instruments. In 1987, it sold its commercial satellite business (both Linkabit and the former Digital Communications Corporation) to form the nucleus of the new Hughes Network Systems in 1987.

In 1990, the remaining governing contracting business of the company (along with the Linkabit name) was sold to San Diego-based Titan Corporation. In 2005, Titan was acquired by L-3 Communications, which in 2019 merged with Harris Corporation to become L3Harris.

== Spinoff companies ==
Among more than 200 wireless-related startups formed in San Diego from 1971-2000, more than 60 were either direct spinoffs (formed by Linkabit alumni) or indirect (formed by employees of a Linkabit spinoff). This is a rate twice that of Fairchild Semiconductor, the legendary progenitor of Silicon Valley. Of these spinoffs, 22 firms were formed between 1984-1998 alone.

The best known Linkabit spinoff is Qualcomm, which was founded by Jacobs, Viterbi and five other Linkabit alumni in July 1985; the firm issued its IPO in 1991 and joined the Fortune 500 in 1999. Another direct spinoff was ViaSat, which was founded by three Linkabit alumni in 1986 and issued its IPO in 1996.

All three Linkabit founders have received National Medals for lifetime achievements: National Medal of Technology for Jacobs in 1994, and a National Medals of Science for Kleinrock and Viterbi in 2008.
