= Gary and Jerri-Ann Jacobs High Tech High Charter School =

Gary and Jerri-Ann Jacobs High Tech High
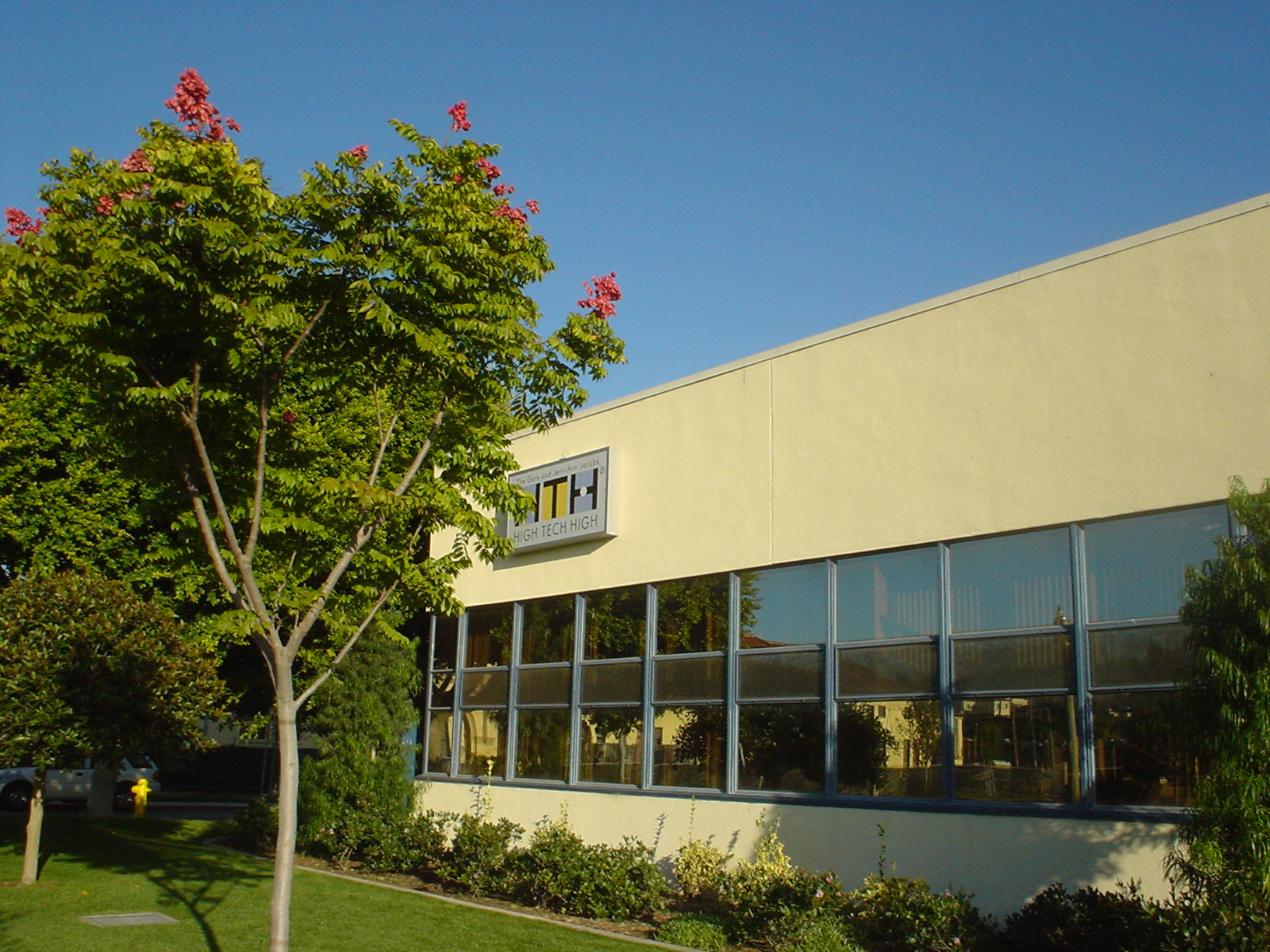
- Northeastern end of High Tech High

Location
- 2861 Womble Rd. San Diego, California 92106; United States

Information
- Type: Public
- Established: 2000
- School district: San Diego Unified School District
- Dean: Marcus Bell
- Head of school: Andrew Gloag
- Faculty: 30
- Grades: 9–12
- Athletics: Cross country, track & field, soccer, softball, surfing, baseball, golf, basketball, volleyball, ultimate frisbee, water polo, swimming, and fencing
- Website: http://www.hightechhigh.org/

Gary and Jerri-Ann Jacobs High Tech High Charter School, often referred to as High Tech High (HTH), is a public charter high school in San Diego, California, United States. The school is now one of several schools operated under the High Tech High charter schools umbrella organization.

== History ==
Beginning in 1998, forty public and corporate partners, led by current board chair Gary Jacobs, began meeting to discuss the current state of education in San Diego. Faced with a shortage of workers for the locally strong high tech and biotech industries, the group wondered why the local school system was not better able to produce more qualified workers. Having given money to the school district in the past and questioning the return on that investment, these local entrepreneurs decided to open a new high school and christened it High Tech High.

Soon thereafter, longtime educator Larry Rosenstock was asked to present to this group about different possible governance structures for the school. He then became the founding principal of the school, and is now the C.E.O. of the network of schools.

The school was founded in September 2000 with 200 students and currently educates 527 students.

High Tech High occupies a building on the former Navy Training Center in the Point Loma area, which is now known as Liberty Station. The school is organized that on a project-based learning model (most learning comes from multi-subject projects, rather than the more traditional approach, where teachers talk and students listen), real-world connection, personalization, and having a common intellectual mission (no ability grouping). Together with several of the other HTH schools, the school is called the "High Tech High Village", which most students simply call "The Village".

== Financing ==
The schools are primarily publicly funded. The Bill and Melinda Gates Foundation contributed a one-time gift of $1000 per student when the school opened, and has pledged millions of dollars to build more schools following the model over the next four years. Some are already in operation. Financial support to develop the original HTH also came from Gary Jacobs, son of Qualcomm founder Irwin Jacobs. Jacobs also donated almost 9 million dollars in building space for three of the schools in the village.

== FIRST Robotics ==
The school is home to one of thirty FIRST Robotics Competition teams in San Diego County. The school's team is named The Holy Cows.

Starting in 2011, High Tech High's The Holy Cows and Francis Parker School's W.A.R. Lords (We Are Robot Lords) began hosting an off-season FIRST Robotics Competition. Known as The Battle at the Border, the event is intended to allow rookie teams to engage in a simulated competition, prior to the start of the next year's official season. Additionally, teams are encouraged to use the event to familiarize new students with the program.

In 2013, The Holy Cows and four other FRC teams lead the 87th Macy's Thanksgiving Day Parade, including: Team 16; The Bomb Squad, Team 180; S.P.A.M., Team 25; Raider Robotix, and Team 1477; Texas Torque.

== Athletics ==
Cross Country/Track & Field Water polo, Women's basketball. Men's basketball, Women's rugby, Men's rugby, Women's soccer, Men's soccer, Women's tennis, Men's tennis, The High Tech High cross country team, known as the Storm, competes in San Diego CIF sanctioned meets and invitationals. They are 2007-2016 reigning Frontier League champions.. The team qualified for the CIF State Cross Country Meet in 2014 and 2016.

In 2024, the High Tech High girls cross country team were the first all-freshman girls team in California state history to qualify for the CIF State Cross Country meet.
