= Larry Rosenstock =

American businessman

Larry Rosenstock is an American who is the founder and CEO emeritus of High Tech High (HTH) and the HTH Graduate School of Education.

== Education ==
He got his Bachelor of Arts in Psychology at Brandeis University in 1970. In 1985 got a Master's of Education in Education Administration at Cambridge College. In 1986 he received a J.D. degree from Boston University School of Law.

== Career ==
During and after law school at Boston University, Rosenstock taught carpentry and woodworking classes to urban youth for a total of eleven years. He also worked as staff attorney for two years at the Harvard Center for Law and Education, and was a lecturer at the Harvard Graduate School of Education for five years. He was a principal of the Rindge School of Technical Arts, and of the Cambridge Rindge and Latin School. He created a program “CityWorks”, which won the Ford Foundation Innovations in State and Local Government Award in 1992.

Rosenstock was the director from 1996 to 1997 of the New Urban High School Project, an effort funded by the U.S. Department of Education to find and describe new models for urban high schools. Rosenstock and his team created three design principles that seemed to be common in the successful urban high schools that they found. These design principles are personalization, real-world connection, and common intellectual mission.

He moved to San Diego to become the president of the Price Charitable Fund from 1997 to 1999.

In 2000, Rosenstock became the C.E.O. and founding principal of High Tech High, first one school and now part of the High Tech High umbrella organization that currently runs sixteen schools in California.

Awards include being named an Ashoka Fellow in 2002 and a Harold W. McGraw, Jr. Prize in Education winner in 2010.
