= High Tech High Chula Vista =

Charter high school in California, United States

Location
- 1945 Discovery Falls Dr; Chula Vista, California; United States; 32°36′28″N 116°57′14″W

Information
- Type: Charter school
- Established: 2007
- Status: Open
- School district: High Tech High
- Grades: 9–12
- Campus type: Open-campus
- Website: Official website

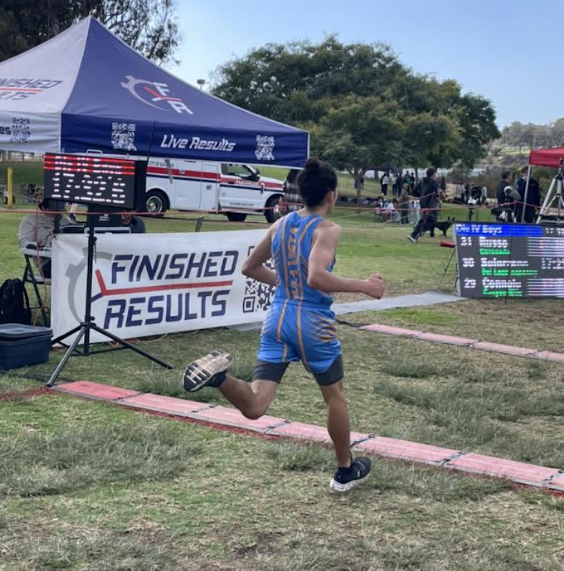
Cross country CIF, 2024, 3 mile variety at Morley field

High Tech High Chula Vista is a charter school in Chula Vista, California. The high school, being open-campus and project-based, opened in the fall of 2007 with approximately 150 9th-grade students. Construction began in June 2008. It was completed in January 2009. The school opened on August 27, 2007. Its facilities were rated as "gold" by the U.S. Green Building Council in 2010. Students are admitted into the school through a randomized lottery acceptance system to bring diversity.

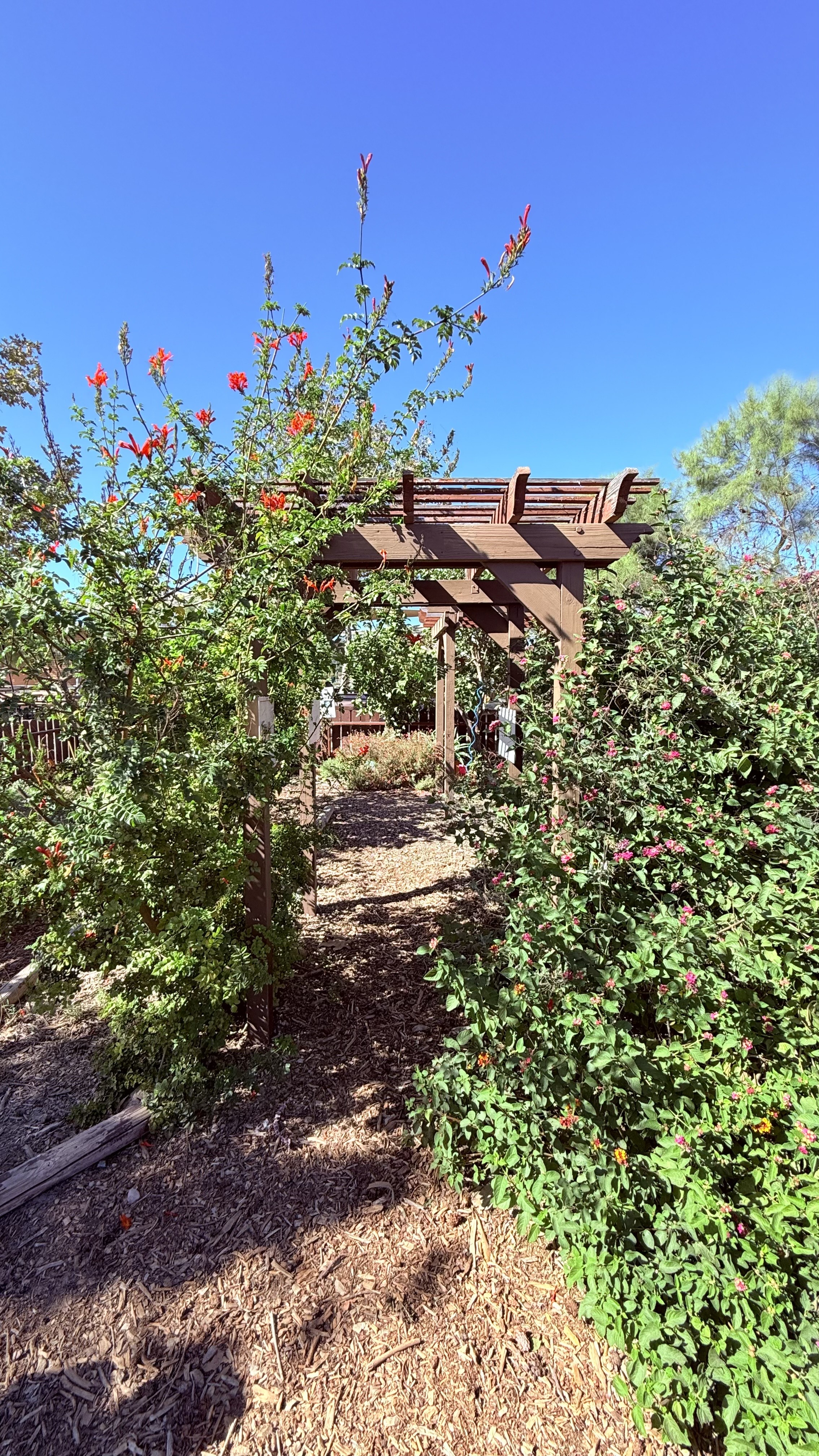
Picture from the inside of High Tech High Chula Vista's Butterfly Garden

High Tech High Chula Vista has an internship program ingrained into the junior-year curriculum. Junior students spend five weeks interning for a professional organization of their choice and need 30 hours a week. The students have a designated mentor in their organization who communicates with and supports them in their work. Juniors must complete a relevant project while in their internship that benefits the organization and is later presented to teachers, families, and mentors.

== Architecture ==
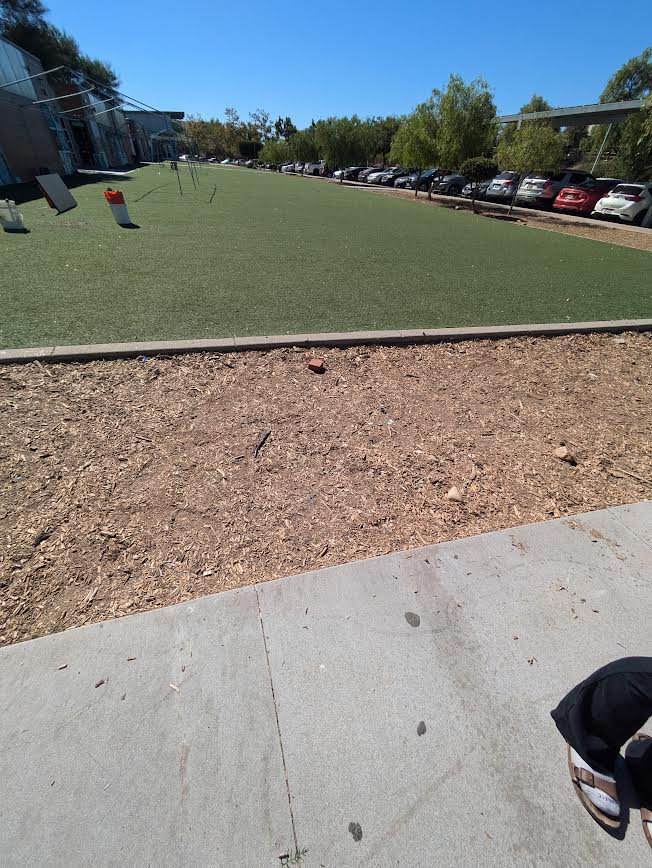
View of the north lawn at High Tech High Chula Vista.

High Tech High Chula Vista is on a parcel overlooking the Otay River Lake. It was built and designed by Studio E Architects using a customized modular construction method. The purpose of HTHCV’s landscape-tailored design is to be distinct and help promote connectivity. The campus was awarded numerous environmental accreditations such as the Gold LEED certification. Its meticulous design serves to reflect High Tech High's driving environmental focus.

== Notable projects ==
=== Totes For Hope ===
Students created tote bags to support clients suffering from disorders at Rady Children’s Hospital. The project was called Totes For Hope and was created by students on December 8, 2021. The students at High Tech wanted people to be aware of the rise in mental health, especially among teens. They learned that these children most likely wouldn’t be home for Christmas, so to make them feel happy, they created this project to help make tote bags. Through this project, the students were able to not only learn how to create tote bags but also learn how it felt to help others kindly. This project drew attention to the variety of problems, stigmas, and structures that affect everyone. The notion that sewing is exclusively for women is one stigma examined in this research, along with its history and instances of pushback. Students discussed these flaws in the history and practices of the fashion industry and wrote letters asking for a change. These all affect mental health, whether people are insecure about wanting to sew or they feel resentment for the practices of the fashion industry. At the end of the day, a project about making bags for strangers to remind them that they are not alone has highlighted corrupt systems, and internal conflict, and questioned a system that not many people are aware of the mental health effects of.

=== Beyond the Crossfire ===
In 2014, 45 High Tech High Chula Vista students including Trisa Mercado, Kamila Casteneda, and Gabriel Garcia had their film admitted to the first White House film festival. Teachers Nuvia Crisol Ruland and Matt Simon were motivated to support the cause. They hoped that the money would be able to support gun-violence-affected communities nationwide. The film, “Beyond the Crossfire” was centered around technology and its connection to students and information. These topics were touched upon due to the then President of the United States, Barack Obama’s incentive to encourage the use of technology in education. Marcado and Garcia received honors from the President for their efforts. The attempt that 45 High Tech High Chula Vista juniors made to aid people outside of their neighborhood are covered in the article Chula Vista Students Raise $18,000 for a Gun Violence documentary.

=== CSI & Math ===
Craig Ogino is a crime expert at the San Diego police department hoping to show high school students how math is used in the forensics part of crime solving. Local high schoolers from High Tech High Chula Vista and Otay Ranch High School’s Academy of Criminology and Justice gathered at the Chula Vista Police Department. 40 students, ranging from different juniors and seniors at the two schools, spent their time measuring how to figure out the amount of methamphetamine a suspect had in possession by measuring cylinders. They saw the different states of crime-scenes and used different math concepts to figure out how and when a crime scene occurred. Many of the students enjoyed this project because they got to connect how math could realistically apply to life outside of school.

== Notable Clubs ==
=== United Youth Leadership Bike Club ===
The United Lowrider Youth Leadership Bike Club is a program which focuses on influencing the next generation by teaching them about the lowrider community, how to build custom lowrider bikes, and supporting other youth programs. This program partners with several schools, with High Tech High Chula Vista being one of them, for mostly helping with STEM fairs. They also partner with other organizations to help with other community events.

== Curriculum ==
High Tech High Chula Vista is a part of the High Tech High (HTH) network of charter schools in San Diego, California, founded in 2000. HTH schools serve students from kindergarten through 12th grade, offering a hands-on, multi-subject approach to education. It’s a project-based school with an emphasis on preparing students for STEM (Science, Technology, Engineering, and Mathematics) fields. There are six total campuses; Original, International, Media Arts, Chula Vista, Mesa, and North county. In addition to these campuses, there is a High Tech High Graduate School of Education. This institution provides training for educators to implement the HTH model. When admitting students to the school, High Tech High uses a zip code-based lottery to help promote diversity among the student body. High Tech High has many values; equity, personalization, authentic work, and collaborative design. This nontraditional, hands-on learning approach fosters innovation, critical thinking, and real-world problem-solving skills. All their class courses fulfill the University of California's A-G requirements. Class sizes at this school are also small, this helps teachers connect with their students and understand their passions while preparing them for college.

== Current events ==
=== College Palooza ===
Every year in November, High Tech High Chula Vista hosts an event called the College Palooza. This event was created with the intent of helping students with applying to college. Since it took place right before the application deadline, one of the main themes of this event was something called: “no pie until you apply.” Students got to choose either apple, cherry, or pizza pie. This helped to motivate students to get over the stress of applying and completing the application.

== Notable alumni ==
- Caleb Vazquez, one of the perpetrators of the Islamic Center of San Diego shooting
