= Nonblocking minimal spanning switch =

A substitute for a 16x16 crossbar switch made from 12 4x4 crossbar switches.

A nonblocking minimal spanning switch is a concept developed in the 1950s to reduce the costs of telephone exchanges in the Bell System by reducing the number of the most expensive components of a telephone switch.

This reflects a key problem in the AT&T Bell System prior to divestiture in 1984, which was

providing satisfactory (from the customer point of view) end-to-end service at the lowest possible cost.

Historically, in telephone switches, connections between callers were arranged with Strowger switches, which were large, expensive banks of electromechanical relays. Later the Strowger switches were replaced by crossbar switches, which used a matrix of connections (called crosspoints) to set up calls.

The Operations Research Department at Bell Labs and other technical staff focused on developing mathematics and computer tools to minimize costs subject to constraints. In the context of making telephone connections, this was taken to mean minimizing the number of the most expensive switch components -- the crosspoints -- subject to the constraint of still being able to connect any two idle telephones on request.

In the 1940s and 1950s, engineers in Bell Lab began an extended series of mathematical investigations into methods for reducing the size and expense of the "switched fabric" needed to implement a telephone exchange. For this purpose a minimal non-blocking network of crossbar switches would be any device that can connect N inputs to N outputs in any sequence while using as few crosspoints as possible. The term "non-blocking" means that if the switch is not defective, it can always make the connection. The term "minimal" means that it has the fewest possible crosspoints, and therefore the minimal expense.

The mathematical analysis that establishes the conditions under which a switching network is minimal non-blocking was performed by Charles Clos, and a switched fabric constructed of smaller switches is called a Clos network.

== Background: switching topologies ==
=== The crossbar switch ===
The crossbar switch has the property of being able to connect N inputs to N outputs in any one-to-one combination, so it can connect any caller to any non-busy receiver, a property given the technical term "nonblocking". Being nonblocking it could always complete a call (to a non-busy receiver), which would maximize service availability.

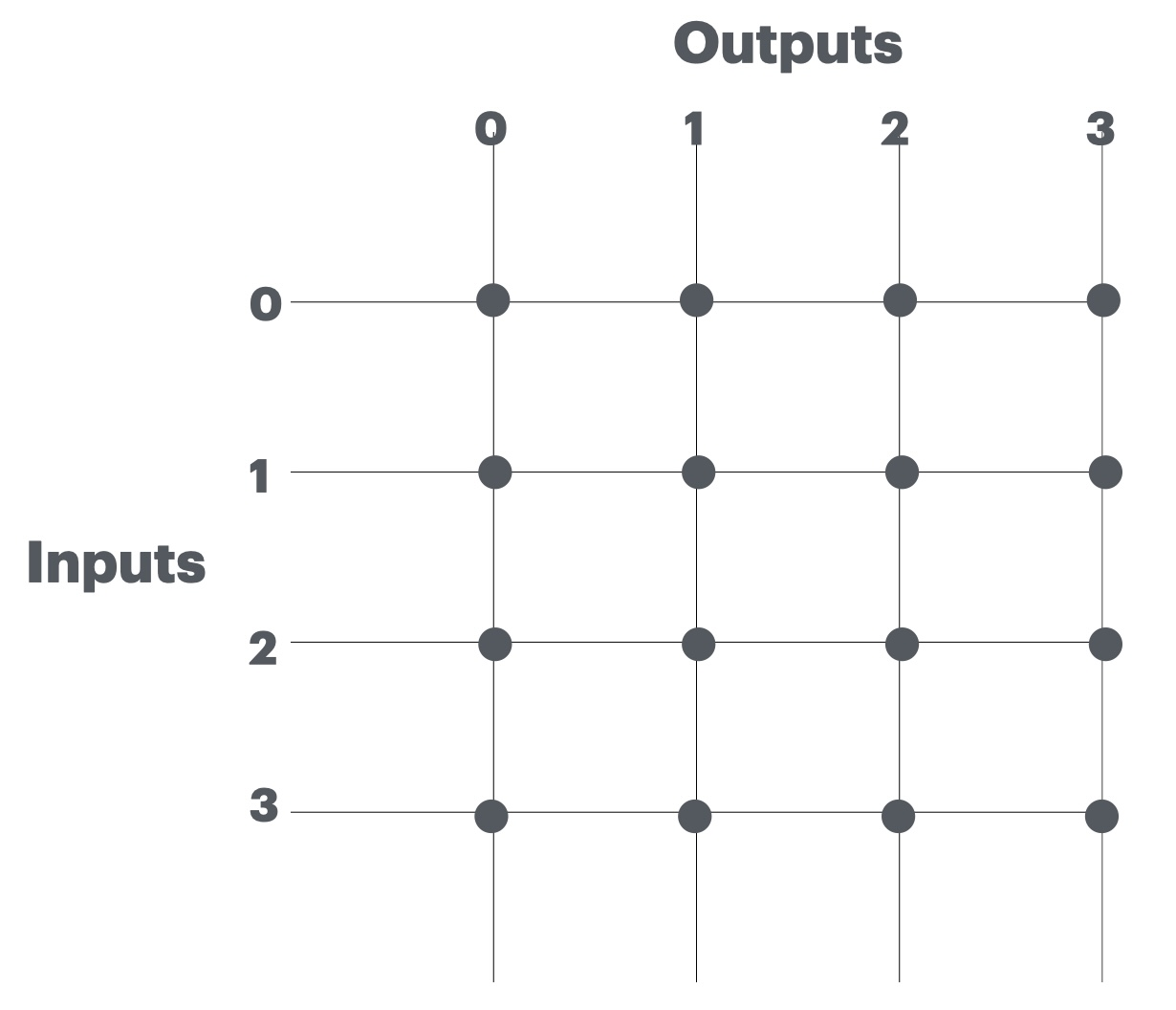
Diagram of a 4x4 crossbar switch.

However, the crossbar switch does so at the expense of using N^{2} (N squared) electrical connections, or crosspoints, implemented by simple SPST switches. The diagram shows a crossbar switch with N=4. The crosspoints are represented by filled circles. There are 16 crosspoints, one for each combination of input and output. When a crosspoint is activated, the corresponding input and output are connected.

For large N (and the practical requirements of a phone switch are considered large) this growth was too expensive. Further, large crossbar switches had physical problems. Not only did the switch require too much space, but the metal bars containing the switch contacts would become so long that they would sag and become unreliable. Engineers also noticed that at any time, each bar of a crossbar switch was only making a single connection. The other contacts on the two bars were unused. This seemed to imply that most of the switching fabric of a crossbar switch was wasted.

=== Completely connected 3-layer switches ===
One way to reduce the cost of a crossbar switch is to emulate it with smaller crossbar switches. These smaller crossbar switches could also, in turn be emulated by even smaller crossbar switches. The switching fabric could become very efficient, and possibly even be created from standardized parts. A Clos network does this.

The approach is to break apart the crossbar switch into three layers of smaller crossbar switches. There is an "input layer", a "middle layer" and an "output layer." The smaller switches are less massive, more reliable, and generally easier to build, and therefore less expensive. In addition, compared to large crossbar switches, the multi-layer switching fabric uses fewer crosspoints.

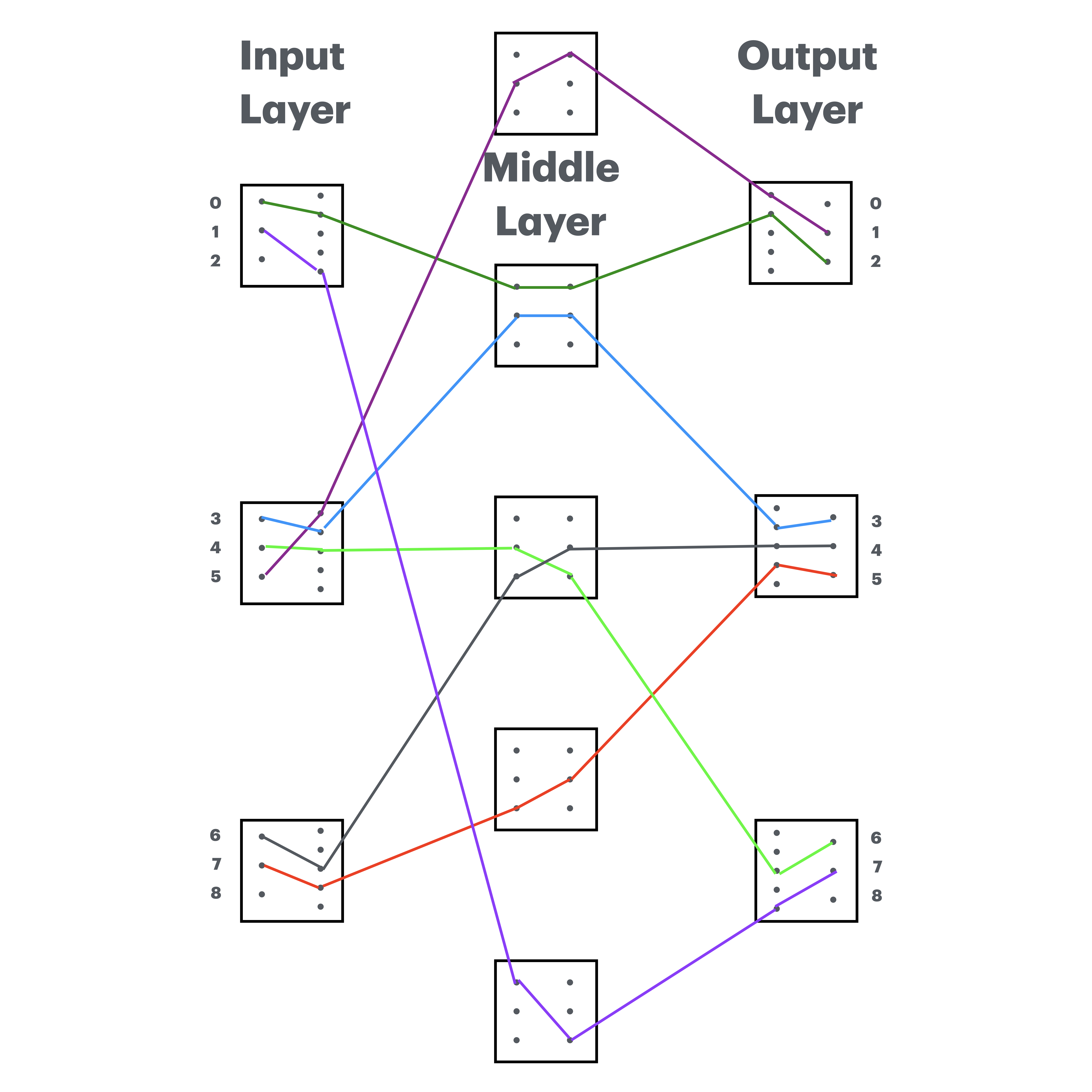
Emulating a 9x9 crossbar switch with 3 layers of 3x3 switches

Suppose we want to synthesize a 9 by 9 crossbar switch. The design could have 3 switches on the input side, each with 3 inputs, for 9 total inputs. Further, on the output side, we could also have 3 output switches, each with 3 outputs, for a total of 9 outputs. Every input and output switch will be connected to every middle switch. The goal is to use as few crosspoints as possible, because crosspoints are an expensive component of a switch.

The questions are how many middle switches are needed to provide a nonblocking fabric, thus emulating a crossbar switch, and will the number of crosspoints be reduced? Charles Clos showed in his 1953 paper that the number of middle switches required for this example is 5, and in general, is 2N−1 for N input and output switches.

The basic algorithm for managing a three-layer switch is to search the middle subswitches for a middle subswitch that has unused wires to the needed input and output switches. Once a connectible middle subswitch is found, connecting to the correct inputs and outputs in the input and output switches is trivial.

The example is intentionally small, and in such a small example, the reorganization does not save crosspoints. A 9x9 crossbar has 81 crosspoints, while a 9x9 minimal spanning switch has 3x3x5×3 = 135 contacts, providing no savings.

As the numbers get larger, the savings appear. For example, a 10,000 line exchange would need 100 million crosspoints to implement a full crossbar. Input and output layers of 100 100×199 switches and a middle layer of 199 100x100 switches would use only 3x199x100x100 crosspoints, or about 6 million crosspoints, a savings of 94% of the crosspoints.

=== Managing a minimal spanning switch ===
The crucial discovery was a way to reorganize connections in the middle switches to "trade wires" so that a new connection could be completed.

The first step is to find an unused link from the input subswitch to a middle-layer subswitch (which we shall call A), and an unused link from a middle-layer subswitch (which we shall call B) to the desired output subswitch. Since, prior to the arrival of the new connection, the input and output subswitches each had at least one unused connection, both of these unused links must exist.

If A and B happen to be the same middle-layer switch, then the connection can be made immediately just as in the "2n−1" switch case. However, if A and B are different middle-layer subswitches, more work is required. The algorithm finds a new arrangement of the connections through the middle subswitches A and B which includes all of the existing connections, plus the desired new connection.

Make a list of all of the desired connections that pass through A or B. That is, all of the existing connections to be maintained and the new connection. The algorithm proper only cares about the internal connections from input to output switch, although a practical implementation also has to keep track of the correct input and output switch connections.

In this list, each input subswitch can appear in at most two connections: one to subswitch A, and one to subswitch B. The options are zero, one, or two. Likewise, each output subswitch appears in at most two connections.

Each connection is linked to at most two others by a shared input or output subswitch, forming one link in a "chain" of connections.

Next, begin with the new connection. Assign it the path from its input subswitch, through middle subswitch A, to its output subswitch. If this first connection's output subswitch has a second connection, assign that second connection a path from its input subswitch through subswitch B. If that input subswitch has another connection, assign that third connection a path through subswitch A. Continue back and forth in this manner, alternating between middle subswitches A and B. Eventually one of two things must happen:

1. the chain terminates in a subswitch with only one connection, or
2. the chain loops back to the originally chosen connection.

In the first case, go back to the new connection's input subswitch and follow its chain backward, assigning connections to paths through middle subswitches B and A in the same alternating pattern.

When this is done, each input or output subswitch in the chain has at most two connections passing through it, and they are assigned to different middle switches. Thus, all the required links are available.

There may be additional connections through subswitches A and B which are not part of the chain including the new connection; those connections may be left as-is.

After the new connection pattern is designed in the software, then the electronics of the switch can actually be reprogrammed, physically moving the connections. The electronic switches are designed internally so that the new configuration can be written into the electronics without disturbing the existing connection, and then take effect with a single logic pulse. The result is that the connection moves instantaneously, with an imperceptible interruption to the conversation. In older electromechanical switches, one occasionally heard a clank of "switching noise."

This algorithm is a form of topological sort, and is the heart of the algorithm that controls a minimal spanning switch.

== Practical implementations of switches ==
As soon as the algorithm was discovered, Bell system engineers and managers began discussing it. After several years, Bell engineers began designing electromechanical switches that could be controlled by it. At the time, computers used tubes and were not reliable enough to control a phone system (phone system switches are safety-critical, and they are designed to have an unplanned failure about once per thirty years). Relay-based computers were too slow to implement the algorithm. However, the entire system could be designed so that when computers were reliable enough, they could be retrofitted to existing switching systems.

It's not difficult to make composite switches fault-tolerant. When a subswitch fails, the callers simply redial. So, on each new connection, the software tries the next free connection in each subswitch rather than reusing the most recently released one. The new connection is more likely to work because it uses different circuitry.

Therefore, in a busy switch, when a particular PCB lacks any connections, it is an excellent candidate for testing.

To test or remove a particular printed circuit card from service, there is a well-known algorithm. As fewer connections pass through the card's subswitch, the software routes more test signals through the subswitch to a measurement device, and then reads the measurement. This does not interrupt old calls, which remain working.

If a test fails, the software isolates the exact circuit board by reading the failure from several external switches. It then marks the free circuits in the failing circuitry as busy. As calls using the faulty circuitry are ended, those circuits are also marked busy. Some time later, when no calls pass through the faulty circuitry, the computer lights a light on the circuit board that needs replacement, and a technician can replace the circuit board. Shortly after replacement, the next test succeeds, the connections to the repaired subswitch are marked "not busy," and the switch returns to full operation.

The diagnostics on Bell's early electronic switches would actually light a green light on each good printed circuit board, and light a red light on each failed printed circuit board. The printed circuits were designed so that they could be removed and replaced without turning off the whole switch.

The eventual result was the Bell 1ESS. This was controlled by a CPU called the Central Control (CC), a lock-step, Harvard architecture dual computer using reliable diode–transistor logic. In the 1ESS CPU, two computers performed each step, checking each other. When they disagreed, they would diagnose themselves, and the correctly running computer would take up switch operation while the other would disqualify itself and request repair. The 1ESS switch was still in limited use as of 2012, and had a verified reliability of less than one unscheduled hour of failure in each thirty years of operation, validating its design.

Initially it was installed on long-distance trunks in major cities, the most heavily used parts of each telephone exchange. On the first Mother's Day that major cities operated with it, the Bell system set a record for total network capacity, both in calls completed, and total calls per second per switch. This resulted in a record for total revenue per trunk.

== Digital switches ==
A practical implementation of a switch can be created from an odd number of layers of smaller subswitches. Conceptually, the crossbar switches of the three-stage switch can each be further decomposed into smaller crossbar switches. Although each subswitch has limited multiplexing capability, working together they synthesize the effect of a larger N×N crossbar switch.

In a modern digital telephone switch, application of two different multiplexer approaches in alternate layers further reduces the cost of the switching fabric:

1. space-division multiplexers are something like the crossbar switches already described, or some arrangement of crossover switches or banyan switches. Any single output can select from any input. In digital switches, this is usually an arrangement of AND gates. 8000 times per second, the connection is reprogrammed to connect particular wires for the duration of a time slot. Design advantage: In space-division systems the number of space-division connections is divided by the number of time slots in the time-division multiplexing system. This dramatically reduces the size and expense of the switching fabric. It also increases the reliability, because there are far fewer physical connections to fail.
2. time-division multiplexers each have a memory which is read in a fixed order and written in a programmable order (or vice versa). This type of switch permutes time-slots in a time-division multiplexed signal that goes to the space-division multiplexers in its adjacent layers. Design advantage: Time-division switches have only one input and output wire. Since they have far fewer electrical connections to fail, they are far more reliable than space-division switches, and are therefore the preferred switches for the outer (input and output) layers of modern telephone switches.

Practical digital telephonic switches minimize the size and expense of the electronics. First, it is typical to "fold" the switch, so that both the input and output connections to a subscriber-line are handled by the same control logic. Then, a time-division switch is used in the outer layer. The outer layer is implemented in subscriber-line interface cards (SLICs) in the local presence street-side boxes. Under remote control from the central switch, the cards connect to timing-slots in a time-multiplexed line to a central switch. In the U.S. the multiplexed line is a multiple of a T-1 line. In Europe and many other countries it is a multiple of an E-1 line.

The scarce resources in a telephone switch are the connections between layers of subswitches. These connections can be either time slots or wires, depending on the type of multiplexing. The control logic has to allocate these connections, and the basic method is the algorithm already discussed. The subswitches are logically arranged so that they synthesize larger subswitches. Each subswitch, and synthesized subswitch is controlled (recursively) by logic derived from Clos's mathematics. The computer code decomposes larger multiplexers into smaller multiplexers.

If the recursion is taken to the limit, breaking down the crossbar to the minimum possible number of switching elements, the resulting device is sometimes called a crossover switch or a banyan switch depending on its topology.

Switches typically interface to other switches and fiber optic networks via fast multiplexed data lines such as SONET.

Each line of a switch may be periodically tested by the computer, by sending test data through it. If a switch's line fails, all lines of a switch are marked as in use. Multiplexer lines are allocated in a first-in-first out way, so that new connections find new switch elements. When all connections are gone from a defective switch, the defective switch can be avoided, and later replaced.

As of 2018, such switches are no longer made. They are being replaced by high-speed Internet Protocol routers.

== Example of rerouting a switch ==
Signals A, B, C, D are routed but signal E is blocked, unless a signal, such as D shown in purple is rerouted

After D, in purple, is rerouted, Signal E can be routed and all the additional signals plus E are connected

== See also ==
- Time-slot interchange
- Clos network
- Crossbar switch
- Banyan switch
- Fat tree
- Omega network
