= Grid network =

Type of network topology

Layout of a grid low-voltage network

A grid network is a computer network consisting of a number of computer systems connected in a grid topology.

In a regular grid topology, each node in the network is connected with two neighbors along one or more dimensions. If the network is one-dimensional, and the chain of nodes is connected to form a circular loop, the resulting topology is known as a ring. Network systems such as FDDI use two counter-rotating token-passing rings to achieve high reliability and performance. In general, when an n-dimensional grid network is connected circularly in more than one dimension, the resulting network topology is a torus, and the network is called "toroidal". When the number of nodes along each dimension of a toroidal network is 2, the resulting network is called a hypercube.

A parallel computing cluster or multi-core processor is often connected in regular interconnection network such as a de Bruijn graph, a hypercube graph, a hypertree network, a fat tree network, a torus, or cube-connected cycles.

A grid network is not the same as a grid computer or a computational grid, although the nodes in a grid network are usually computers, and grid computing requires some kind of computer network or "universal coding" to interconnect the computers.

== See also ==
- Grid plan - street network
- Network topology
