= Post-processing =

Post-processing may refer to:

- Image editing in photography
- Audio editing software in audio
- Differential GPS post-processing, an enhancement to GPS systems that improves accuracy
- Video post-processing, methods used in video processing and 3D graphics
- Finite element model data post-processing, software that makes computer calculation output easier to understand
