= Hypertree (disambiguation) =

Hypertree may refer to one of the following:

- Hypertree, a special kind of hypergraph, e.g., a hypergraph without cycles
- Hypertree decomposition in constraint satisfaction
- Hypertree network, a type of computer/communication network topology
- Hyperbolic tree, a visualization method for hierarchical structures
