= D cell =

D cell can mean:

- D battery, a common size of dry-cell electrical battery
- D cell (biology), a hormone secreting, regulatory cell type found in the stomach

== See also ==
- DCell, one of the Data center network architectures
- dCell, a division of Lowe Lintas
- D-Cell Games, an independent game studio most notable for developing UNBEATABLE
