= Hiroshi Inose =

Japanese electrical engineer (1927–2000)

Professor Emeritus at University of Tokyo Hiroshi Inose FREng
- Hiroshi Inose
- Born: January 5, 1927; Nezu, Tokyo, Japan
- Died: October 11, 2000 (aged 73)
- Education: University of Tokyo, B.E. 1948 and D.E. 1955
- Engineering career
- Discipline: Electrical Engineering
- Projects: Time-Slot Interchange System

Hiroshi Inose FREng (猪瀬 博, Inose Hiroshi; January 5, 1927 – October 11, 2000) was a Japanese electrical engineer, known as the inventor of the Time-Slot Interchange system (TSI), which is basic to modern digital telephone switches. Inose was highly involved within his career. He held positions such as director general, chairman, associate professor, and president specific committees pertaining to engineering and technology. He was awarded with many honorific titles. In 1976 he received the Marconi Prize, in 1993 the Harold Pender Award, and in 1994 the IEEE Alexander Graham Bell Medal.

== Life ==
Hiroshi Inose was born in Nezu, Tokyo in Japan on January 5, 1927. He obtained his Bachelor of Engineering degree from the University of Tokyo in 1948 and his doctorate degree there in 1955, respectively. Inose married his wife Mariko in 1960.

From 1956 to 1958, Inose was an associate at the University of Pennsylvania and employed as a consultant at the Bell Telephone Laboratories in Murray Hill, New Jersey where he invented the TSI system. This system was the basis of the digital telephone switches.

Aside from his invention, he became an associate professor in the Faculty of Engineering at the University of Tokyo in 1958 and in 1961 was promoted to full professor. Inose also served as the Dean of the Faculty of Engineering as well as Director for the Computer Center and the Center for Bibliographic Information. He "...spent sabbatical terms at the University of Pennsylvania, Philadelphia, and the University of Michigan, Ann Arbor."

Being a well-rounded person as he was, Inose was also a visiting professor at Rheinishe-Westfalishe Technische Hochschule in 1974 in Aachen, Germany and a Sherman Fairchild Distinguished Scholar at California Institute of Technology in 1981 in Pasadena. Starting April 1987, Inose became the founding Director General of the National Center of Science Information System (NACSIS) for Japan and was responsible for expanding the NACSIS into the National Institute of Informatics (NII) in 2000, which he was the first director-general.

Just after expanding NACSIS to NII and after a few days of the opening of the new building for the institute, Dr. Inose died of a heart attack on October 11, 2000. His sudden death "...caused widespread grief..." in his native land and throughout America and Europe.

== Time-Slot Interchange system ==
Inose was well known, internationally, for his invention of the TSI system while he was at AT&T Bell Laboratories. The idea of the TSI was to implement time switches into digital switching systems. The system collects data and stores them in a time slot and allows the time slot to be interchanged with another. It contains one physical input and one physical output. "He built a prototype digital time-division multiplexing (TDM) electronic switching system called CAMPUS, which is based on the TSI principle..." Although this invention was crucial, it did not receive much recognition due to costly memory devices. Later in the 1970s when semiconductor technologies began advancing, TSI received more recognition. Since its first commercial deployment in 1976, it has been popular and utilized amongst the digital central office switching systems and digital private branch exchanges.

== The National Institute for Informatics ==
The NII was designed to integrate research and development in information and communication science and for development of academic research and education informatics infrastructure. Upon establishing the institute, Inose encouraged researchers to focus on "..."real world problems" in formulating their research programs and to address..." the problems alongside scientific issues they often focus on. One of Inose's main goals for the NII was to create an interdisciplinary approach to research in which they take part in inter-sectoral collaboration with academia, government, and industrial laboratories.

== Publications ==
During Inose's time, he made many publications. Over 150 articles that he published were in Japanese and international professional journals. Aside from publishing articles in Japanese, Inose also published several books in English. Some of his publications consist of An Introduction to Digital Integrated Communications Systems, Information Technology and Civilization (published with John R. Pierce, Road Traffic Control (published with Takashi Hamada) and Creativity and Culture (published with Stephen Jay Gould).

Besides his published articles and books, he was interested in poetry and published his poetry book Festina Lente with John R. Pierce.

== Involvements ==
- Inventor of the Time-Slot Interchange System (TSI)
- 1958 - Associate Professor at the University of Tokyo in the Faculty of Engineering
- (1961 - 1987) - Full Professor at the University of Tokyo in Electrical Engineering
- 1969 - Visiting Professor at University of Michigan
- 1974 - Visiting Professor at Rheinishe-Westfalishe Technische Hochschule in Germany
- 1981 - Sherman Fairchild Distinguished Scholar at the California Institute of Technology
- (1981 - 1983) - President of Information Processing Society of Japan
- (1984 - 1987) - Chairman of the Committee for Scientific and Technological for the Organisation for Economic Co-operation and Development (OECD)
- (1985 - 1986) - President of the Institute of Electronics and Communication Engineers of Japan
- 1987 - Director General of the National Center for Science Information Systems
- (1988 - 1990) - Chairman of the Committee for Information, Computer and Communication Policy for OECD

== Honors and awards ==
- 1976 - Marconi Prize
- 1977 - elected to the United States National Academy of Sciences
- 1979 - elected to the American Philosophical Society
- 1979 - Japan Academy Prize
- 1993 - Harold Pender Award
- 1994 - IEEE Alexander Graham Bell Medal
- 1997 - IT Award from the Asian-Oceanian Computing Industry Organization (ASOCIO)

Awards
| Preceded by Donald Cox | IEEE Alexander Graham Bell Medal; 1994 | Succeeded by Irwin M. Jacobs |
