= Beneš method =

In queueing theory, a discipline within the mathematical theory of probability, Beneš approach or Beneš method is a result for an exact or good approximation to the probability distribution of queue length. It was introduced by Václav E. Beneš in 1963.

== Overview ==
The method introduces a quantity referred to as the "virtual waiting time" to define the remaining workload in the queue at any time. This process is a step function which jumps upward with new arrivals to the system and otherwise is linear with negative gradient. By giving a relation for the distribution of unfinished work in terms of the excess work, the difference between arrivals and potential service capacity, it turns a time-dependent virtual waiting time problem into "an integral that, in principle, can be solved."
