= Václav E. Beneš =

Czech-American mathematician (born 1930)

- Born: 24 July 1930 (age 96)
- Education: Princeton University
- Known for: Beneš network Beneš method
- Spouse: Janet
- Scientific career
- Workplaces: Bell Labs; Columbia University
- Thesis: Mathematical Logic (1953)
- Doctoral advisor: John G. Kemeny
- Doctoral students: Ioannis Karatzas

Václav Edvard "Vic" Beneš (born July 24, 1930) is a Czech-American mathematician known for his contributions to the theory of stochastic processes, queueing theory and control theory, as well as the design of telecommunications switches.

He studied under John Kemeny and gained a doctorate in mathematics at Princeton University (1953) on a treatise on Mathematical logic.

He then worked for Bell Labs until 1986, contributing to Kalman filter theory as well as the Beneš network, a permutation network of the Clos network type. In the 1980s he held a position at Columbia University as well. He has continued to publish independently since 1989.

He was elected IEEE Fellow (1991) for "contributions to the structure of telephone connecting networks, stochastic control, and nonlinear filtering". The Benesfest was celebrated at Columbia University (2001) to honor his 70th birthday. He resides in Millburn, New Jersey (since 1985) where he has been a long-time mountain climber and member of the American Alpine Club, and currently heads the local historical society.

He is a relative of the former President of Czechoslovakia Edvard Beneš and politician Vojta Beneš. Emilie Benes Brzezinski, a sculptor, was his sister.

His first wife Janet was the daughter of Philip Franklin and niece of Norbert Wiener.

== Books ==
- General stochastic processes in the theory of queues (Addison-Wesley, 1963)
- Mathematical Theory of Connecting Networks and Telephone Traffic (Academic Press, 1965)

== Journal publications ==
- Mr. Mayo on “Rules” of language, Philosophical Studies, 3(2):33–36, April 1951 (review).
- A Partial Model for Quine's "New Foundations", The Journal of Symbolic Logic, Vol. 19, No. 3, pp. 197–200, September 1954
- On the Consistency of an Axiom of Enumerability, J. Symb. Log. 20(1):29–30, 1955
- On queues with Poisson arrivals, Ann. Math. Statist., vol. 28, pp. 670–677, 1956
- On Trunks with Negative Exponential Holding Times Serving a Renewal Process, Bell System Technical Journal, 37, pp. 211–258, 1958
- Fluctuations of telephone traffic, Bell System Technical Journal, 38, pp. 965–974, 1959
- Transition probabilities for telephone traffic, Bell System Technical Journal 38. pp. 211–258, 1959
- A Sufficient Set of Statistics for a Simple Telephone Exchange Model, Bell System Technical Journal, 38, pp. 939–964, 1959
- General Stochastic Processes in Traffic Systems with One Server, Bell System Technical Journal, 39, pp. 127–160, 1960
- Transition Probabilities for Telephone Traffic, Bell System Technical Journal, 39, pp. 1297–1320, 1960
- Covariance function of simple trunk group, with applications to traffic measurement, Bell System Technical Journal, 1961
- Heuristic Remarks and Mathematical Problems Regarding the Theory of Switching Systems, Bell System Technical Journal, vol. 41, pp. 1201–1247, 1962
- On Rearrangeable Three-Stage Connecting Networks, Bell System Technical Journal, vol. XLI, Sep. 1962, No. 5, pp. 1481–1491.
- A "Renewal" Limit Theorem for General Stochastic processes, Ann. Math. Statist. Volume 33, Number 1, 98–113, 1962
- Growth, Complexity and Performance of Telephone Connecting Networks, Bell System Technical Journal, Vol. 62, No. 3, pp. 499–539, February 1963,
- Optimal Rearrangeable Multistage Connecting Networks, Bell System Technical Journal, vol. 43, pp. 1641–1656, 1964
- Permutation groups, complexes and rearrangeable connecting network, Bell System Technical Journal, 43, 4:1619–1640, 1964.
- Index Reduction of FM Waves by Feed-Back and Power-Law Nonlinearities, Bell Labs Technical Journal, Vol.XLIV, No.4, pp. 581–601, April 1965
- Programming and control problems arising from optimal routing in telephone networks, SIAM Journal on Control, 4(??):6–18, 1966
- Existence of finite invariant measures for Markov processes, Proc. Amer.Math. Soc., 18:1058–1061, 1967.
- On some proposed models for traffic in connecting networks, Bell System Technical Journal, 46:105–116, 1967
- Benes and Lawrence Shepp, Wiener Integrals Associated with Diffusion processes, Theory of Probability, 13, pages 498–501, 1968
- Finite Regular Invariant Measures for Feller Processes, Journal of Applied Probability, Vol. 5, No. 1, pages 203–209, April 1968
- Existence of optimal strategies based on specified information, for a class of stochastic decision problems, SIAM Journal on Control, 8(??):179–188, 1970
- Existence of optimal stochastic control laws, SIAM Journal on Control 9(?):446–475, 1971
- Applications of group theory to connecting networks, Bell System Technical Journal, vol.45, pp. 407–420, 1975
- Proving the rearrangeability of connecting networks by group calculations, Bell System Technical Journal, vol.45, pp. 421–434, 1975
- Full "bang" to reduce predicted miss is optimal, SIAM Journal on Control, 15(?):52–83, 1976
- On Kailath's innovation conjecture, Bell System Technical Journal 55:7, pp. 981–1001, 1976
- Nonexistence of strong nonanticipating solutions to stochastic DEs: implications for functional DEs, filtering, and control. Stochastic Processes Applied 5:3, 243–263., 1977
- Reduction of network states under symmetries, Bell System Technical Journal, 57(1):111–149, 1978
- Benes, Lawrence Shepp and Hans S. Witsenhausen, Some Solvable Stochastic Control Problems, Stochastics 4, 39–83, 1980
- Least-Squares Estimator for Frequency Shift Position Modulation in White Noise, pp. 1289–1296, Sept. 1980
- René K. Boell and V. E. Benes, Recursive non-linear estimation of a diffusion acting as the rate of an observed Poisson process, IEEE Trans. Information Theory, vol. 26: (5), pp. 561–575, 1980.
- Exact Finite Dimensional Filters for Certain Diffusions with Nonlinear Drift, Stochastics, 5, pp. 65–92, 1981.
- Benes and Ioannis Karatzas, Estimation and control for linear, partially observable systems with non-gaussian initial distribution, In Stochastic Processes & Applications, 14, pages 233–248, 1981
- Benes and Karatzas, On the relation of Zakai equation and Mortensen's equation, SIAM Journal on Control and Optimization, 21 pp. 472–489, 1983
- Benes and Karatzas, Filtering of diffusions controlled through their conditional measures, Stochastics, 13, pp. 1–23, 1984
- R. A. Spanke and V. E. Benes, N-stage planar optical permutation network, Applied Optics 26, 1226–, 1987
- Quadratic approximation by linear systems controlled from partial observations, In Stochastic Analysis: Liber Amicorum for Moshe Zakai, Academic Press, 1991
- Benes, Kurt Helmes and Raymond. W. Rishel, Pursuing a maneuvering target which uses a random process for its control, IEEE Trans. on Automatic Control, 40(2), 1995
- Benes and Robert J. Elliott, Finite dimensional risk sensitive information states, I.F.A.C. Symposium on Nonlinear Control System Design, Lake Tahoe, CA, 471–476, June 1995
- Benes and Robert J. Elliott, Finite-dimensional solutions of a modified Zakai equation, Mathematics of Control, Signals, and Systems, 9, 341–351, 1996
- Nonlinear filtering and optimal quality control, in Journal of Applied Mathematics and Stochastic Analysis, vol. 11, no. 3, pp. 225–230, 1998.
