= Butterfly network =

Network topology for parallel computers

A butterfly network is a technique to link multiple computers into a high-speed network. This form of multistage interconnection network topology can be used to connect different nodes in a multiprocessor system.

== Technical requirements ==
The interconnect network for a shared memory multiprocessor system must have low latency and high bandwidth unlike other network systems, like local area networks (LANs) or internet for three reasons:

- Messages are relatively short as most messages are coherence protocol requests and responses without data.
- Messages are generated frequently because each read-miss or write-miss generates messages to every node in the system to ensure coherence. Read/write misses occur when the requested data is not in the processor's cache and must be fetched either from memory or from another processor's cache.
- Messages are generated frequently, therefore rendering it difficult for the processors to hide the communication delay.

== Components ==
The major components of an interconnect network are:

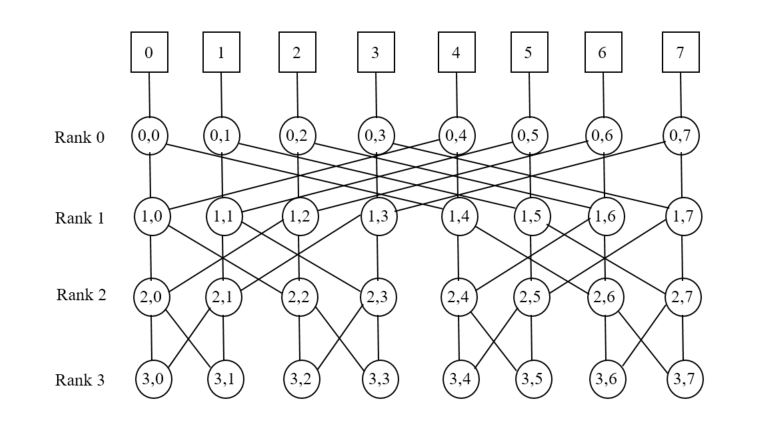
Figure 1: Butterfly Network for 8 processors

- Processor nodes, which consist of one or more processors along with their caches, memories and communication assist.
- Switching nodes (Router), which connect communication assist of different processor nodes in a system. In multistage topologies, higher level switching nodes connect to lower level switching nodes as shown in figure 1, where switching nodes in rank 0 connect to processor nodes directly while switching nodes in rank 1 connect to switching nodes in rank 0.
- Links, which are physical wires between two switching nodes. They can be uni-directional or bi-directional.

These multistage networks have lower cost than a cross bar, but obtain lower contention than a bus. The ratio of switching nodes to processor nodes is greater than one in a butterfly network. Such topology, where the ratio of switching nodes to processor nodes is greater than one, is called an indirect topology.

The network derives its name from connections between nodes in two adjacent ranks (as shown in figure 1), which resembles a butterfly. Merging top and bottom ranks into a single rank, creates a Wrapped Butterfly Network. In figure 1, if rank 3 nodes are connected back to respective rank 0 nodes, then it becomes a wrapped butterfly network.

BBN Butterfly, a massive parallel computer built by Bolt, Beranek and Newman in the 1980s, used a butterfly interconnect network. Later in 1990, Cray Research's machine Cray C90, used a butterfly network to communicate between its 16 processors and 1024 memory banks.

== Butterfly network building ==
For a butterfly network with p processor nodes, there need to be p(log_{2} p + 1) switching nodes. Figure 1 shows a network with 8 processor nodes, which implies 32 switching nodes. It represents each node as N(rank, column number). For example, the node at column 6 in rank 1 is represented as (1,6) and node at column 2 in rank 0 is represented as (0,2).

For any 'i' greater than zero, a switching node N(i,j) gets connected to N(i-1, j) and N(i-1, m), where, m is inverted bit on i^{th} location of j. For example, consider the node N(1,6): i equals 1 and j equals 6, therefore m is obtained by inverting the i^{th} bit of 6.

| Variable | Binary representation | Decimal Representation |
|---|---|---|
| j | 110 | 6 |
| m | 010 | 2 |

As a result, the nodes connected to N(1,6) are :

| N(i,j) | N(i-1,j) | N(i-1,m) |
| (1,6) | (0,6) | (0,2) |

Thus, N(0,6), N(1,6), N(0,2), N(1,2) form a butterfly pattern. Several butterfly patterns exist in the figure and therefore, this network is called a Butterfly Network.

== Butterfly network routing ==
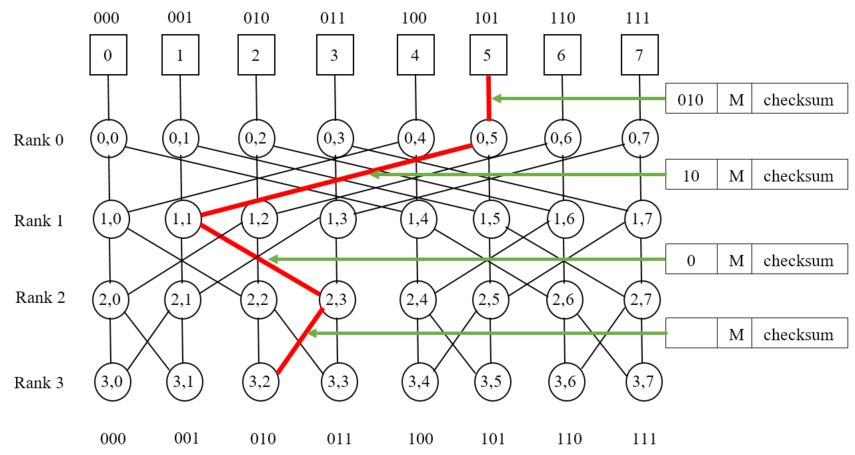
Figure 2: Butterfly Network Routing

In a wrapped butterfly network (which means rank 0 gets merged with rank 3), a message is sent from processor 5 to processor 2. In figure 2, this is shown by replicating the processor nodes below rank 3. The packet transmitted over the link follows the form:

| Header | Payload | Trailer |

The header contains the destination of the message, which is processor 2 (010 in binary). The payload is the message, M and trailer contains checksum. Therefore, the actual message transmitted from processor 5 is:

| 010 | M | checksum |

Upon reaching a switching node, one of the two output links is selected based on the most significant bit of the destination address. If that bit is zero, the left link is selected. If that bit is one, the right link is selected. Subsequently, this bit is removed from the destination address in the packet transmitted through the selected link. This is shown in figure 2.

- The above packet reaches N(0,5). From the header of the packet it removes the leftmost bit to decide the direction. Since it is a zero, left link of N(0,5) (which connects to N(1,1)) gets selected. The new header is '10'.
- The new packet reaches N(1,1). From the header of the packet it removes the leftmost bit to decide the direction. Since it is a one, right link of N(1,1) (which connects to N(2,3)) gets selected. The new header is '0'.
- The new packet reaches N(2,3). From the header of the packet it removes the leftmost bit to decide the direction. Since it is a zero, left link of N(2,3) (which connects to N(3,2)) gets selected. The header field is empty.
- Processor 2 receives the packet, which now contains only the payload 'M' and the checksum.

== Butterfly network parameters ==
Several parameters help evaluate a network topology. The prominent ones relevant in designing large-scale multi-processor systems are summarized below and an explanation of how they are calculated for a butterfly network with 8 processor nodes as shown in figure 1 is provided.

- Bisection Bandwidth: The maximum bandwidth required to sustain communication between all nodes in the network. This can be interpreted as the minimum number of links that need to be severed to split the system into two equal portions. For example, the 8 node butterfly network can be split into two by cutting 4 links that crisscross across the middle. Thus bisection bandwidth of this particular system is 4. It is a representative measure of the bandwidth bottleneck which restricts overall communication.
- Diameter: The worst case latency (between two nodes) possible in the system. It can be calculated in terms of network hops, which is the number of links a message must travel in order to reach the destination node. In the 8 node butterfly network, it appears that N(0,0) and N(3,7) are farthest away, but upon inspection, it is apparent that due to the symmetric nature of the network, traversing from any rank 0 node to any rank 3 node requires only 3 hops. Therefore, the diameter of this system is 3.
- Links: Total number of links required to construct the entire network structure. This is an indicator of overall cost and complexity of implementation. The example network shown in figure 1 requires a total of 48 links (16 links each between rank 0 and 1, rank 1 and 2, rank 2 and 3).
- Degree: The complexity of each router in the network. This is equal to the number of in/out links connected to each switching node. The butterfly network switching nodes have 2 input links and 2 output links, hence it is a 4-degree network.

== Comparison with other network topologies ==
This section compares the butterfly network with linear array, ring, 2-D mesh and hypercube networks. Linear array can be considered as a 1-D mesh topology. Relevant parameters are compiled in the table (‘p’ represents the number of processor nodes).

Network parameters
| Topology | Diameter | Bisection Bandwidth | Links | Degree |
|---|---|---|---|---|
| Linear array | $p-1$ | 1 | $p-1$ | 2 |
| Ring | $p/2$ | 2 | p | 2 |
| 2-D mesh | 2(√p - 1) | √p | 2√p(√p - 1) | 4 |
| Hypercube | log_{2}(p) | $p/2$ | log_{2}(p) × (p/2) | log_{2}(p) |
| Butterfly | log_{2}(p) | $2^h$ , h = number of nodes in a single layer | log_{2}(p) × 2p | 4 |

=== Advantages ===
- Butterfly networks have lower diameter than other topologies like a linear array, ring and 2-D mesh. This implies that in butterfly network, a message sent from one processor would reach its destination in a lower number of network hops.
- Butterfly networks have higher bisection bandwidth than other topologies. This implies that in butterfly network, a higher number of links need to be broken in order to prevent global communication.
- It has a bigger computer range.

=== Disadvantages ===
- Butterfly networks are more complex and costlier than other topologies due to the higher number of links required to sustain the network.

The difference between hypercube and butterfly lies within their implementation. Butterfly network has a symmetric structure where all processor nodes between two ranks are equidistant to each other, whereas hypercube is more suitable for a multi-processor system which demands unequal distances between its nodes. By looking at the number of links required, it may appear that hypercube is cheaper and simpler compared to a butterfly network, but as the number of processor nodes go beyond 16, the router cost and complexity (represented by degree) of butterfly network becomes lower than hypercube because its degree is independent of the number of nodes.

In conclusion, no single network topology is best for all scenarios. The decision is made based on factors like the number of processor nodes in the system, bandwidth-latency requirements, cost and scalability.

== See also ==
- Parallel computing
- Network topology
- Mesh networking
