= Cheyenne (supercomputer) =

Supercomputer in Wyoming

The Cheyenne supercomputer at the NCAR-Wyoming Supercomputing Center (NWSC) in Cheyenne, Wyoming operated for seven years as one of the world's most powerful and energy-efficient computers from 2017 to 2024. Ranked in November 2016 as the 20th most powerful computer in the world and November 2023 as 159th by its TOP500 rank, the 5.34-petaflops system is capable of more than triple the amount of scientific computing performed by NCAR's previous supercomputer, Yellowstone. It also is three times more energy efficient than Yellowstone, with a peak computation rate of more than 3 billion calculations per second for every watt of power consumed.

The National Science Foundation and the State of Wyoming through an appropriation to the University of Wyoming funded Cheyenne to provide the United States with a major new tool to advance understanding of the atmospheric and related Earth system sciences. High-performance computers such as Cheyenne allow researchers to run increasingly detailed models that simulate complex processes to estimate how they might unfold in the future. These predictions give resource managers and policy experts valuable information for planning ahead and mitigating risk. Cheyenne's users advanced the knowledge needed for saving lives, protecting property, and enabling U.S. businesses to better compete in the global marketplace.

Scientists across the country used Cheyenne to study phenomena ranging from weather and climate to wildfires, seismic activity, and airflows that generate power at wind farms. Their findings lay the groundwork for better protecting society from natural disasters, lead to more detailed projections of seasonal and longer-term weather and climate variability and change, and improve weather and water forecasts that are needed by economic sectors from agriculture and energy to transportation and tourism.

The supercomputer's name was chosen to honor the people of Cheyenne, Wyoming, who supported the installation of the NWSC and its computers there. The name also commemorates the 150th anniversary of the city, which was founded in 1867 and named for the Native American Cheyenne Nation.

In April 2024, Cheyenne was listed for auction on a government surplus site, with bidding starting at $2,500. After 27 bids, the auction closed on May 3, 2024 at a final bid of US$480,085.

== Replacement ==
Cheyennes' replacement 'Derecho' was announced on January 27, 2021. It is a 19.87 petaflop HPE Cray System capable of 20 quadrillion calculations per second, said to be 3.5 times faster than Cheyenne. It was scheduled to be operational in early 2022, but officially launched on July 7, 2023.

It has 2488 homogenous (CPU) compute nodes and 82 heterogenous (GPU) compute nodes, 382 NVidia A100 graphics processing units, and 692 terabytes of total memory.

== System Description ==
The Cheyenne supercomputer was built by Silicon Graphics International Corporation (SGI) in coordination with centralized file system and data storage components provided by DataDirect Networks (DDN). The SGI high-performance computer is a 5.34-petaflops system, meaning it can carry out 5.34 quadrillion calculations per second. The data storage system for Cheyenne was integrated with NCAR's existing GLobally Accessible Data Environment (GLADE) file system. The DDN storage provides an initial capacity of 20 petabytes, expandable to 40 petabytes with the addition of extra drives. This, combined with 16 petabytes of GLADE, totals 36 petabytes of high-speed storage as of February 2017.

Cheyenne is an SGI ICE XA system with 4,032 dual-socket scientific computation nodes running 18-core 2.3-GHz Intel Xeon E5-2697v4 processors with 203 [now 315] terabytes of memory. Interconnecting these nodes is a Mellanox EDR InfiniBand network with 9-D enhanced hypercube topology that performs with a latency of only 0.5 microseconds. Cheyenne runs the SUSE Linux Enterprise Server 12 SP1 operating system.

Cheyenne was integrated with many other high-performance computing resources in the NWSC. The central feature of this supercomputing architecture is its shared file system that streamlines science workflows by providing computation, analysis, and visualization work spaces common to all resources. This GLADE common data storage pool, provides 36.4 petabytes of online disk capacity shared by the supercomputers, two data analysis and visualization (DAV) cluster computers, data servers for both local and remote users, and a data archive with the capacity to store 320 petabytes of research data. High-speed networks connect this Cheyenne environment to science gateways, data transfer services, remote visualization resources, Extreme Science and Engineering Discovery Environment (XSEDE) sites, and partner sites around the world.

This integration of computing resources, file systems, data storage, and broadband networks allowed scientists to simulate future geophysical scenarios at high resolution, then analyze and visualize them on one computing complex. This improved scientific productivity by avoiding the delays associated with moving large quantities of data between separate systems. Further, this reduced the volume of data that needed to be transferred to researchers at their home institutions. Cheyenne made more than 1.2 billion core-hours available each year to researchers in the Earth system sciences.
