= Crossover switch =

In electronics, a crossover switch or matrix switch is a switch connecting multiple inputs to multiple outputs using complex array matrices designed to switch inputs to outputs such that each output is connected to only one input, but usually inputs may be connected to multiple outputs. There are blocking and non-blocking types of cross-over switches. In a non blocking switch, the switch allows arbitrary interconnections and disconnections to each output at all times whereas a blocking switch new connections can be constrained by other connections.

These switches can be microelectromechanical systems, electrical, or nonlinear optical systems, and are used in electronics and fiber optic circuits, as well as some optical computers. A banyan switch is one type of cross-over switch. Their complexity depends on the topology of the individual switches in a switch matrix (how wide it is by how many 'plies' or layers of switches it takes), to implement the desired crossover logic.

== Formula ==
Typical crossover matrices follow the formula: an N×N Banyan switch uses (N/2) log N elements. Other formulas are used for differing number of cross-over layers, and scaling is possible, but becomes very large and complex with large N×N arrays. CAD and AI can be used to take the drudgery out of these designs.

== Measurement ==
The switches are measured by how many stages, and how many up/down sorters and crosspoints. Switches often have buffers built in to speed up switching speeds. A typical switch may have a 2×2 and 4×4 down sorter, followed by an 8×8 up sorter, followed by a 2×2 crosspoint banyan switch network, resulting in a 3-level sorting for a 3-stage banyan network switch. The future is moving to larger arrays of inputs and outputs needed in a very small space.

== See also ==
- Clos switch
- Crossbar switch
