= Donald Cox (engineer) =

American electrical engineer

- Born: Donald C. Cox; November 22, 1937 (age 88)
- Education: University of Nebraska (BS, MS); Stanford University (PhD)
- Occupation: Electrical engineer
- Awards: Marconi Prize (1983); IEEE Alexander Graham Bell Medal (1993)

Donald C. Cox (born November 22, 1937) is an American electrical engineer researching wireless communication, currently a professor at the University of Nebraska–Lincoln, where he heads the Wireless Communications Research Group. His work on multipath and other propagation problems has been fundamental to the development of mobile phone technology.

Cox was elected a member of the National Academy of Engineering in 1994 for research and leadership in wireless personal communications technologies and systems.

In 1979, Donald Cox was elevated to IEEE fellow for contributions to the understanding of radio propagation effects in mobile telephone and satellite communications systems.

== Biography ==
Cox received a B.S. and an M.S. in electrical engineering from the University of Nebraska in 1959 and 1960, respectively. After 3 years working in communications system design at Wright-Patterson Air Force Base, he attended Stanford University, where he received his Ph.D. in electrical engineering in 1968. Next he went to work at Bell Labs. He became part of Bellcore (now Telcordia Technologies) when it was formed in 1984, and he stayed there until 1993, when he left to take an academic position at Stanford. He has been a member of the IEEE since its formation, and is particularly active in the IEEE Communications Society.

== Honors and awards ==
- co-recipient Marconi Prize (1983)
- IEEE Alexander Graham Bell Medal (1993)
- IEEE Third Millennium Medal (2000)
- member, National Academy of Engineering (1994)
- Honorary Dr. of Science, University of Nebraska–Lincoln (1983)

Awards
| Preceded by James Massey | IEEE Alexander Graham Bell Medal; 1993 | Succeeded by Hiroshi Inose |
