= CISL Research Data Archive =

NCAR Research Data Archive archives data for atmospheric and geosciences research. The archive is maintained by the Data Support Section of the Computational and Information Systems Laboratory] (CISL) at the National Center for Atmospheric Research (NCAR) in Boulder, Colorado.

The archive acquires, curates, preserves and disseminates an extensive list of over 700 data sets. Registration is free and open to the general public. Nearly all of the datasets are free to all registered users; a few are restricted to certain users (e.g. university researchers).

In addition, the catalog shows data sets available in these categories: atmospheric, oceanographic, geophysical, hydrology, gridded analysis and MM5 model input data. The archive also maintains climate model output products for use in assessment and impact studies. Model outputs came directly from the modellers or from the IPCC Data Distribution Center The archive also stores a number of source codes for the efficient handling and analysis of data.

NCAR RDA also provides data rescue services for any discipline for a fee.
