= Finite element model data post-processing =

Finite element model data post-processing is a paradigm for transforming the often highly detailed and complex outputs of Finite Element Method (FEM) calculations into a format that is easily understood by the user. The outputs from post-processing may be used in engineering judgements or analysis, as part of validity/functionality checks on the FEM model, or for the purpose of reporting results.

Post processing of finite element data generally requires additional software or programming to specify how the data is to be transformed or presented. This software may include checks on the codes and standards to which the model must comply (e.g., the check of panel stiffened structures). Using this software can be considered part of the knowledge-based engineering principle.
