= Marconi Society =

American foundation for science

- Formation: 1974
- Founder: Gioia Marconi Braga
- Headquarters: Cleveland, Ohio
- Website: https://marconisociety.org/

The Guglielmo Marconi International Fellowship Foundation, briefly called Marconi Foundation and currently known as The Marconi Society, was established by Gioia Marconi Braga in 1974 to commemorate the centennial of the birth of her father, Guglielmo Marconi (April 24, 1874).

The Marconi International Fellowship Council was established to honor significant contributions in science and technology by awarding the Marconi Prizeto a living scientist who has advanced communication technology that benefits mankind. Although Braga died in July 1996, the Marconi Society has continued to award the annual Marconi Prize and fellowship, which were first awarded in 1975.

The Marconi Society also grants annual Marconi Society-Paul Baran Young Scholar Awards to young scientists who, by the time they turn 27, have made significant contributions in the fields of communication and information science. Originally, the Foundation was located at the Aspen Institute. In 1997, it relocated, by invitation, to Columbia University's Fu School of Engineering and Applied Science. The organization is currently headquartered in Chicago, Illinois.

== The Marconi Prize ==
The Marconi Prize is an annual award recognizing achievements and advancements made in the field of communications (radio, mobile, wireless, telecommunications, data communications, networks, and Internet). Recipients of the prize are awarded at the Marconi Awards Gala. The Marconi Prize winners are also named as Marconi Fellows. The first woman to win the award was Andrea Goldsmith in 2020.

== Marconi Society Lifetime Achievement Award ==
Occasionally, the Marconi Society Lifetime Achievement Award is bestowed on legendary late-career individuals, recognizing their transformative contributions and remarkable impacts to the field of communications and to the development of the careers of students, colleagues and peers, throughout their lifetimes. So far, the recipients include:

- 2000: Claude E. Shannon
- 2003: William O. Baker
- 2005: Gordon E. Moore
- 2009: Amos E. Joel Jr.
- 2011: Robert W. Galvin
- 2017: Thomas Kailath
- 2023: Vint Cerf
- 2025: Martin Cooper

== The Paul Baran Young Scholar Award ==
Since 2008, the Marconi Society has also issued the Paul Baran Young Scholar Awards, which celebrate young leaders in advanced communications technology.

Recipient	Year
Salman Abdul Baset Rafael Laufer Jay Kumar Sundararajan Hao Zou	2008
Felix Guierrez Marco Papaleo Eric Plum K Sebastien Soudan Eitan Yaakobi	2009
Aleksandr Biberman Diomidis Michalopoulos Yuan Shen	2010
Joseph Kakande Bill Ping Piu Kuo	2011
Aakanksha Chowdhery Guilhem de Valicourt Keun Yeong Cho	2012
Salvatore Campione Ke Wang Domanic Lavery	2013
Kiseok Song	2014
Himanshu Asnani Kartik Venkat Joseph Lukens Ken Pesyna	2015
Min-Yu Huang Vasuki Narasimha Swamy Bichai Wang	2019
Piotr Roztocki Vikram Iyer Yasaman Ghasempour	2020
Shuowen Zhang	2021
Gregory Tanyi Rui Zhang	2022
Zixian Wei Ronit Sohanpal	2023
Duschia Bodet Tara Boroushaki Javier Conde Nakul Garg	2024
Ruth Gebremedhin Thomas Micallef Yidong Ren Raghav Subbaraman	2025
