= Raymond W. Ketchledge =

American electrical engineer (1919–1987)

- Born: Raymond Waibel Ketchledge; December 8, 1919; Harrisburg, Pennsylvania, U.S.
- Died: October 23, 1987 (aged 67); Englewood, Florida, U.S.
- Education: Massachusetts Institute of Technology (BS, MS)
- Occupation: Engineer
- Known for: Contributions to the first computerized telephone switching control systems
- Spouse: Lois Jane Quackenbush
- Awards: IEEE Alexander Graham Bell Medal (1976)
- Scientific career
- Fields: Electrical engineering

Raymond Waibel Ketchledge (December 8, 1919 – October 23, 1987) was an American engineer, known for his contributions to the first computerized telephone switching control systems.

== Biography ==
Born in Harrisburg, Pennsylvania, Ketchledge married Lois Jane Quackenbush. He earned a B.Sc. and M.Sc. (1942) in electrical engineering from the Massachusetts Institute of Technology before joining Bell Labs where he stayed for his whole professional career (1942–1982).

At Bell Labs he first worked on the Mark 24 FIDO Torpedo used in World War II, then took part in developing the first underwater repeater systems and the L3 coaxial carrier for Transatlantic telephone cable systems (1946–1954), before becoming the leader of the Switching systems development group (1956). This brought him fame due to the pioneering work on applying stored program architecture to telephone switching systems. Ketchledge oversaw the installation project for the first 1ESS switch in Succasunna (1965).

Following this he directed the Indian Hill laboratories of Naperville, Illinois (1966–1975), before returning to New Jersey where he oversaw the Ocean systems research division in Whippany, New Jersey, until his retirement. He held sixty patents in diverse areas, including thirty-one in switching systems.

He died of cancer at his home in Englewood, Florida, on October 23, 1987.

== Awards ==
- National Academy of Engineering inductee (1970)
- IEEE Alexander Graham Bell Medal (1976) with Amos E. Joel Jr. and William Keister
- IEEE Fellow
- New Jersey Inventors Hall of Fame inductee

Awards
Preceded by (first)	IEEE Alexander Graham Bell Medal; 1976	Succeeded by Eberhardt Rechtin
