= John Cioffi =

American engineer (born 1956)

John M. Cioffi
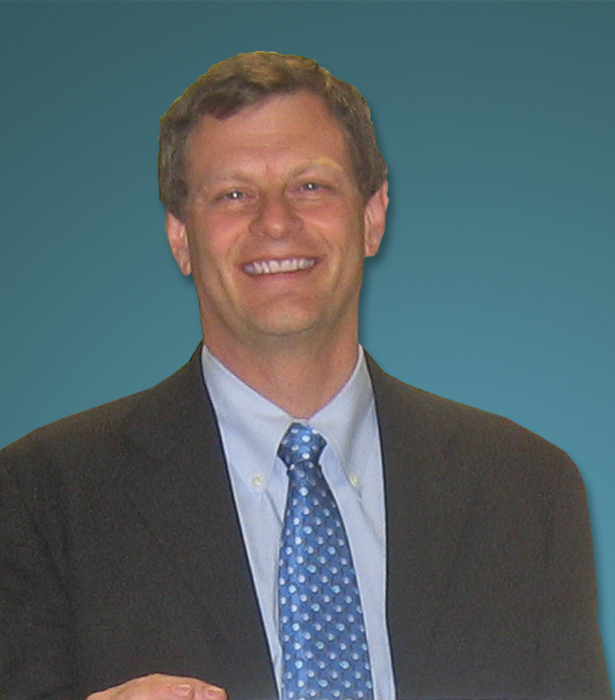
- Born: November 7, 1956 (age 69); Illinois, U.S.
- Education: Stanford University (PhD); University of Illinois at Urbana–Champaign (BSEE)
- Known for: Digital subscriber line
- Awards: Marconi Prize (2006); IEEE Alexander Graham Bell Medal (2010); IET J J Thomson Medal (2000); FREng; NAE
- Scientific career
- Fields: Digital communications Coding theory
- Workplaces: Stanford University
- Doctoral advisor: Thomas Kailath
- Doctoral students: Peter Sienpin Chow; Inkyu Lee

John Mathew Cioffi (born November 7, 1956) is an American electrical engineer, educator and inventor who has made contributions in telecommunication system theory, specifically in coding theory and information theory. Best known as "the father of DSL," Cioffi's pioneering research was instrumental in making digital subscriber line (DSL) technology practical and has led to over 400 publications and more than 100 pending or issued patents, many of which are licensed.

== Early life and education ==
John Cioffi was born and raised in Illinois. He earned a B.S.E.E. degree from the University of Illinois at Urbana–Champaign in 1978.

From 1978 to 1982, Cioffi worked as a modem designer at Bell Laboratories in New Jersey. While at Bell Laboratories, he also attended Stanford University, where he earned a MS in Electrical Engineering at Stanford University in 1979, and Ph.D. degree in Electrical Engineering in 1984, under the supervision of Thomas Kailath.

== Career ==
In 1984, Cioffi left Bell Labs to work at IBM as a hard disk drive read channel researcher.

In 1986, Cioffi began his teaching career as an assistant professor of electrical engineering at Stanford University. Cioffi supervised the Ph.D. programs of more than 70 students over the course of more than two decades. His and his students' research into discrete multitone modulation (DMT) became widely adopted in digital subscriber line (DSL) technology, used commonly for Internet access.

In 1991, at the age of 35, Cioffi took a leave of absence from Stanford to found Amati Communications Corporation. His vision was to build DSL modems based on his and his students' research. Many of Cioffi's then-current and former students followed him to Amati, where they built the Prelude modem, a DSL modem that could transmit 6+ megabits per second over 9,000 ft (2,700 m) of telephone line. The Prelude modem would go on to win what has become known as the "Bellcore ADSL Olympics" in 1993 by performing significantly better than modems using single-carrier modulation techniques, such as quadrature amplitude modulation (QAM) and carrierless amplitude phase modulation (CAP), including modems from AT&T and Bellcore. Hundreds of millions of people now use DSL based on Amati's innovations.

In 1993, Cioffi returned to Stanford, although he remained involved with Amati as an officer and director until its 1998 acquisition by Texas Instruments. Cioffi's research interests then turned to dynamic spectrum management (DSM), an improvement on DSL that mitigates service interruptions and allows DSL lines to run with higher and more reliable data rates.

In 2001, Cioffi was elected as a member into the National Academy of Engineering for contributions to the theory and practice of high-speed digital communications.

In 2003, Cioffi founded Adaptive Spectrum and Signal Alignment, Inc. (ASSIA) to help service providers realize improvements in the performance and profitability of their DSL networks. Today ASSIA's customers collectively provide DSL service to more than 70 million subscribers worldwide.

In 2009, Cioffi assumed emeritus status at Stanford, as the Hitachi Professor Emeritus of Engineering. He is now CEO and Chairman of ASSIA.

== Honors and awards ==
Cioffi has received numerous awards and honors. Among them are:

- National Medal of Technology and Innovation (2023)
- IEEE Leon K. Kirchmayer Award for Graduate Teaching (2014)
- IEEE Alexander Graham Bell Medal (2010)
- Honorary Doctorate, Edinburgh University (2010)
- The Economist Innovation Award – Computing and Telecommunications (2010)
- University of Illinois Outstanding Alumni Awards (Electrical Engineering 1999 and School of Engineering 2010)
- International Fellow Royal Society of Engineering (UK) (2009)
- Marconi Prize (2006)
- Member National Academy of Engineering (2001)
- IEEE Koji Kobayashi Computers and Communications Award (2001)
- IEEE Third Millennium Medal (2000)
- IET J. J. Thomson Medal (2000)
- IEEE Fellow (1996) for contributions to the theory, practice, and promotion of advanced communication methods in data transmission and storage.
- Outstanding Achievement Award, American National Standards Institute for contributions to ADSL (1995)

== Selected publications ==
- T. Starr, M. Sorbora, J.M. Cioffi, and P.J. Silverman, DSL Advances, Prentice Hall, 2003.
- T. Starr, J.M. Cioffi, and P.J. Silverman, Understanding Digital Subscriber Line Technology, Prentice Hall, 1999.
- J.M. Cioffi, Chapter 4, "Generalized Decision-Feedback Equalization for Packet Transmission with ISI and Gaussian Noise" of Communications, Computation, Control and Signal Processing, a Tribute to Thomas Kailath, editors A. Paulraj, V. Roychowdhury, and C.D. Schaper, Kluwer Academic Publishers, 1997.
- J.M. Cioffi, Chapter 34, "Asymmetric Digital Subscriber Lines" of the Communications Handbook, Editor-in-Chief, J.D. Gibson, CRC Press in cooperation with IEEE Press, 1997.
- J.M. Cioffi, Chapter 15, "Adaptive Filtering" of the Digital Signal Processing Handbook, editors S.K. Mitra and J.F. Kaiser, Van Nostrand Reinhold, 1988.
