= John S. Mayo =

John Sullivan Mayo
- Born: February 26, 1930 (age 96); Greenville, North Carolina, United States
- Education: North Carolina State University (B.S., M.S., Ph.D.)
- Occupations: engineer, executive
- Known for: contributions to the computer and telecommunications industry
- Notable work: president of Bell Labs
- Awards: awards list

John Sullivan Mayo (born February 26, 1930) is an American engineer, AT&T executive and seventh president of Bell Labs, known for contributions to the computer and telecommunications industry.

In 1979, Mayo was elected a member of the National Academy of Engineering for contributions and leadership in the realization of digital facilities for the telecommunications network.

== Biography ==
Born in Greenville, North Carolina, he earned B.S., M.S. and Ph.D. degrees in electrical engineering from North Carolina State University.

Following this, Mayo joined Bell Labs, now Nokia Bell Labs, (1955) where he first worked on early computers as the TRADIC and Leprechaun, the digital repeater for the T1 Carrier, the Telstar satellite, ocean sonar systems and various switching systems. He was elected vice president at Bell Labs (1975) and eventually became the seventh president (1991) until his retirement (1995).

Dr. Mayo is credited with globalizing Bell Labs and forging closer ties between its research and development and business units.

In 1990, President George H.W. Bush awarded Dr. Mayo the National Medal of Technology and Innovation in recognition of his pioneering contributions to telecommunications. His work helped usher in the information age by transforming the nation's telephone network from analog to digital technology, laying the foundation for modern communications.

Dr. Mayo also coined the term "killer technology" which is when a new technology "kills" a previous technology. He explained that the use of lightwave technology is "killing" or eliminating the need for wire-based coaxial cable since lightwave can transmit information at a significantly higher speed.

== Awards ==
- IEEE Fellow (1967).
- Outstanding Engineering Alumnus of North Carolina State University (1977).
- With Eric E. Sumner and M. Robert Aaron he won the IEEE Alexander Graham Bell Medal (1978) and the Computer and Communications Society Koji Kobayashi Award (1988) for the pioneer work on T-1.
- Elected to the National Academy of Engineering (1979).
- National Medal of Technology award (1990) for providing the technological foundation for information age communications and for overseeing the conversion of the national switched telephone network from analog to digital-based technology.
- The Industrial Research Institute (IRI) Medal (1992).
- Engineering Manager of the Year by the American Society for Engineering Management (1992).
- American Association of Engineering Societies (AAES) Chair's Award (2010).

Awards
Preceded by Eberhardt Rechtin	IEEE Alexander Graham Bell Medal; 1978	Succeeded by Christian Jacobaeus
