= Service Bureau Corporation =

IBM service bureau subsidiary

- Company type: Subsidiary
- Industry: Time-sharing computers
- Founded: 1932; 94 years ago
- Defunct: 1973
- Fate: Acquired by Control Data Corporation
- Parent: International Business Machines

The Service Bureau Corporation (SBC) had its origins in 1932 as the Service Bureau Division within IBM and was spun off as a wholly owned subsidiary in 1957 to operate IBM's burgeoning service bureau businesses.

IBM had operated service bureaus in major cities beginning in the 1920s allowing users to rent time on tabulating equipment, and later computing equipment, to solve problems which couldn't justify a full-time equipment lease. In 1956, as a result of a consent decree with the United States Department of Justice, IBM spun off its service bureaus to force them to operate at "arm's length" from the parent company.

In 1968 IBM transferred its Information marketing Division to SBC. This included the CALL/360 time-sharing service, QUIKTRAN, BASIC, and DATATEXT (a text processing system similar to ATS).

In 1973, to settle a multi-year lawsuit charging anti-competitive behavior in IBM's pre-announcement of a nonexistent high-end System/360 Model 92, IBM sold SBC for $16 million to Control Data Corporation, which had a growing service bureau business of its own.
