= Arun Netravali =

Indian–American computer engineer (1945–2021)

Arun N. Netravali
- Born: May 26, 1945; Ankola, Karnataka, India, Bombay Presidency, British India
- Died: November 4, 2021 (aged 76); Dallas, Texas, U.S.
- Education: IIT Bombay (B.Tech); Rice University (M.S.), (Ph.D.)
- Occupations: Engineer, business executive, professor
- Employer: Bell Laboratories
- Awards: Marconi Prize; Padma Bhushan; National Medal of Technology; IEEE Fellowship

Arun N. Netravali (May 26 1945 – November 4, 2021) was an Indian–American computer engineer credited with contributions in digital technology including HDTV. He conducted research in digital compression, signal processing and other fields. Netravali was the ninth President of Bell Laboratories and served as Lucent's Chief Technology Officer and Chief Network Architect. He received his undergraduate degree from IIT Bombay, India, and an M.S. and a Ph.D. from Rice University in Houston, Texas, all in electrical engineering. Several global universities, including the Ecole Polytechnique Federale in Lausanne, Switzerland, honored him with honorary doctorates.

Netravali worked at NASA from 1970 to 1972, solving technical problems for the space shuttle project.

Netravali led Bell Labs research and development of high definition television (HDTV) and was widely acknowledged as a pioneer in the development of digital video technology. He was the author of over 170 technical papers, 70 patents, and three books in the areas of picture processing, digital television, and computer networks.

Netravali was a member of Tau Beta Pi and Sigma Xi. He is also an IEEE fellow. He has received awards including the Marconi Prize, the Padma Bhushan Award from the Indian government, the National Medal of Technology from President George W. Bush, the Computers & Communications Prize, the Alexander Graham Bell Medal, the IEEE Kilby Medal, the IEEE Frederik Philips Award, and the National Association of Software and Services Companies in India Medal.

Prior to joining Bell Labs, Netravali was an adjunct professor at the Massachusetts Institute of Technology. While at Bell Labs, he taught at City College of New York, Columbia University, and Rutgers University.

Netravali died on November 4, 2021, at the age of 76.

== Awards and honors ==
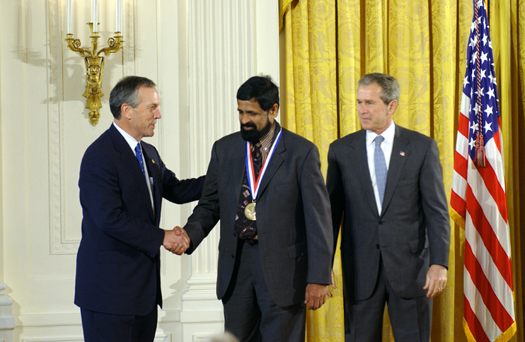
Netravali (center) was presented the 2002 U.S. National Media of Technology by U.S. President George W. Bush (right)

Netravali has received numerous awards and honorary degrees, including

- the Marconi Prize from the Marconi Society in 2017
- the IEEE Jack S. Kilby Signal Processing Medal in 2001 (together with Thomas S. Huang)
- the IEEE Frederik Philips Award in 2001
- the U.S. National Medal of Technology
- the Padma Bhushan from the Government of India
- the IEEE Alexander Graham Bell Medal in 1991 (together with C. Chapin Cutler and John O. Limb)
- elected to member of the National Academy of Engineering in 1989
- elected to IEEE Fellow in 1985
- the IEEE Donald G. Fink Prize Paper Award in 1982 (together with John O. Limb)

== Selected writing ==
- Arun N. Netravali and Barry G. Haskell, Digital Pictures: Representation, Compression and Standards (Applications of Communications Theory), Springer (second edition, 1995), ISBN 0-306-44917-X
- Don P. Mitchell and Arun N. Netravali, Reconstruction Filters in Computer Graphics, Computer Graphics, Vol. 22, No. 4, August 1988. pp. 221-228.

Awards
Preceded by Paul Baran	IEEE Alexander Graham Bell Medal; 1991 with C. Chapin Cutler and John O. Limb	Succeeded by James Massey
