= Eric E. Sumner =

- Born: Eric Eden Sumner; December 17, 1923; Vienna, Austria
- Died: January 19, 1993 (aged 69)
- Education: Cooper Union (BS); Columbia University (MA)
- Occupations: Engineer; scientist
- Known for: Contributions to the early developments of switching systems
- Awards: IEEE Alexander Graham Bell Medal (1978)

Eric Eden Sumner (December 17, 1923 – January 19, 1993) was an Austrian-American engineer and scientist, well known for his contributions to the early developments of switching systems.

Born in Vienna, he moved to New York City where he went to Brooklyn Technical High School, earned a B.S. in mechanical engineering from Cooper Union (1948), and M.A. degrees in physics (1953) and electrical engineering (1960) from Columbia University. Sumner joined Bell Labs (1948) where he became leader of the group that developed the pulse-code modulation transmission system (1955), and later director of transmission systems (1960) that developed the T1 carrier system (1962). Following this, he led the underwater transmission laboratory projects on submarine surveillance systems (1962–67), the transmission media division in Atlanta, Georgia (1967–71) and the loop division (1971-) where he oversaw development of computerized network management systems. After retiring (1989) he served as president of the IEEE (1991) and was chairman of New Jersey Inventor's Hall of Fame. Sumner died of heart failure.

He held eleven patents, and was elected to the National Academy of Engineering (1988). Sumner was an IEEE Fellow and received the IEEE Alexander Graham Bell Medal jointly with M. Robert Aaron and John S. Mayo (1978). The IEEE Eric E. Sumner award includes a bronze medal and was instituted in his name (1995).

Awards
Preceded by Eberhardt Rechtin	IEEE Alexander Graham Bell Medal; 1978	Succeeded by Christian Jacobaeus
