= Richard R. Hough =

Richard Ralston Hough (/ˈhʌf/; December 13, 1917 – July 9, 1992) was a Bell Labs engineer and AT&T executive.

== Biography ==
Hough was born in Trenton, New Jersey, and attended Trenton High School. He received his Bachelor of Science degree in 1939 and a graduate degree in 1940 in electrical engineering from Princeton University. While at Princeton, he was on the school's swimming team and set several world records in that sport.

In 1980 Hough received the IEEE Alexander Graham Bell Medal for his role in the introduction of electronic telephone switching.

He was inaugurated into the International Swimming Hall of Fame in 1970.

He died in a crash in 1992, when the private plane he was piloting experienced engine failure near Concord, New Hampshire.

== See also ==
- List of members of the International Swimming Hall of Fame

Awards
Preceded by Christian Jacobaeus	IEEE Alexander Graham Bell Medal; 1980	Succeeded by David Slepian
