= C. Chapin Cutler =

American electrical engineer (1914–2002)

- Born: Cassius Chapin Cutler; December 16, 1914; Springfield, Massachusetts, U.S.
- Died: December 1, 2002 (aged 87); North Reading, Massachusetts, U.S.
- Education: Worcester Polytechnic Institute (B.S.)
- Known for: Cutler feed Differential pulse-code modulation Corrugated-waveguide filter Project Echo
- Spouse: Virginia Tyler (m. 1941)
- Children: 2
- Awards: IEEE Edison Medal (1981); IEEE Centennial Medal (1984); IEEE Alexander Graham Bell Medal (1991)
- Scientific career
- Fields: Electrical engineering Microwave technology Satellite communications Signal processing
- Workplaces: Bell Labs (1937–1979); Stanford University (1979–2002)

Cassius Chapin Cutler (December 16, 1914 – December 1, 2002), known as C. Chapin Cutler, was an American electrical engineer whose career at Bell Labs spanned more than four decades. His inventions in radio, radar, signal coding, imaging, and satellite communications earned him more than 80 patents. His most significant contributions include the invention of the Cutler feed antenna used on Allied bombers during World War II, differential pulse-code modulation (DPCM), and the corrugated-waveguide filter. He also played a key role in the development of the traveling wave tube and participated in Project Echo and the Telstar experiments, pioneering achievements in satellite communication.

== Early life and education ==
Cutler was born on December 16, 1914, in Springfield, Massachusetts, to Paul A. Cutler and Myra Chapin Cutler. He was raised in a small-town environment and educated in the public school systems of western Massachusetts. At age 14, in 1929, he built his first radio receiver from salvaged parts after reading an article about "The Junk Box Radio" in Radio Craft magazine, an experience he later described as "the most crucial event of my life." Shortly after, his father took him to a lecture by a visiting scientist from the newly established Bell Telephone Laboratories on "The Wonders of Radio and Communication," which inspired his career ambitions.

Cutler graduated from Springfield Technical High School in 1933. His parents were determined that he attend college, though he would be the first in his family to do so. On the suggestion of a neighbor who was a Worcester Polytechnic Institute (WPI) graduate student, he applied to WPI and was accepted. During the Great Depression, Cutler supported himself through college with odd jobs including cleaning windows, washing cars, shoveling snow, and tending coal-fired boilers, earning about 40 cents an hour.

At WPI, Cutler became active in the college's radio club, which held one of the oldest college amateur radio station call signs in the United States (W1YK). He served as president of the club and worked to put the station back on the air. With his friend Nate Korman (who later had a successful career at RCA), Cutler switched from electrical engineering to general science to pursue more electives in advanced physics and mathematics. In 1937, he graduated with distinction, seventh in his class, with a degree in general science. He later took graduate courses at Stevens Institute of Technology and Princeton University but never completed a formal postgraduate degree.

== Career ==
=== Early career at Bell Labs (1937–1945) ===
Job opportunities were scarce in 1937 as the economy had not fully recovered from the Depression; Bell Labs was operating only four days a week to reduce costs. During his interview at Bell Labs' headquarters at 463 West Street in New York City, Cutler met Ralph Bown, a pioneer in military radio communication, who was impressed by Cutler's antenna experiments and attempts at carrier-depressed modulation. Although there were no openings in the New York research departments, Cutler was offered a position at the branch laboratory in Deal, New Jersey, where research focused on shortwave radio, high-power transmitter tubes, antenna designs, and ionospheric radio propagation.

At Deal, Cutler worked under John C. Schelleng, a veteran of the U.S. Army Signal Corps well known for his work on ionospheric radio propagation. His close associates included James Wilson McRae, a recent Ph.D. graduate from Caltech who later became a Bell Labs vice-president. One day, Schelleng told Cutler, "Do what you want. You don't have to check with me. Tell me about it only when you want to," giving him the complete freedom that characterized Bell Labs' research culture. Cutler's first invention was the "self-neutralized amplifier," which balanced internal tube capacitances to prevent capacitive feedback. He and McRae subsequently developed a 200-kW transmitter operating at frequencies from 4 MHz to 23 MHz for 12-channel, single-sideband, multiplex telephony between the United States and England.

=== World War II contributions ===
In 1940, Schelleng asked Cutler to work on the proximity fuze, a secret project to install radio circuits in explosive shells that would detonate near enemy aircraft. The project was conducted under the auspices of the Carnegie Institution and led by physicist Merle Tuve. Cutler designed circuitry and tested fuses at Aberdeen Proving Ground and Indian Point, Maryland.

Late in 1941, McRae and Cutler were assigned to design waveguide components for an X-band aircraft antenna. When McRae was called to Washington to guide the Army Signal Corps into radar technology, Cutler was left alone with the antenna project. Working through a difficult technical problem, he invented what became known as the Cutler feed, a novel antenna feed design using two slots located exactly half a wavelength apart to reduce energy in the side lobes while reinforcing energy in the main beam. The design used a screw in the splitting head to adjust field distributions, making it simple and reliable.

The Cutler feed was produced by the thousands and was installed aboard virtually every Allied bomber in the latter part of World War II. When radar technology was unveiled to the public in 1945, an artist's rendition of the Cutler feed appeared in the August 20, 1945, issue of Time magazine. During this period, Cutler also invented the corrugated waveguide and various multimode antenna feeds, though this work remained classified for many years.

=== Traveling wave tube research ===
After the war, AT&T announced a crash program to build an intercity microwave relay system from New York to Boston. Cutler was invited to a presentation by John R. Pierce about the traveling wave tube (TWT), invented by Rudolf Kompfner in England, which promised major breakthroughs for microwave circuits. Cutler was asked to study the circuit problems of the TWT and moved his laboratory to the newly constructed Bell Labs research center in Murray Hill, New Jersey. Pierce started the theoretical analysis while Cutler performed measurements. Longing to make his own tubes rather than wait weeks for the specialized shop, Cutler studied vacuum systems and built his own pumping station using a thoriated tungsten cathode heated white-hot by electron bombardment.

Calvin Quate joined Bell Labs in 1950 and Kompfner in 1951. Pierce had theorized that noise on the electron beam due to thermal emission should appear as waves on the beam. Cutler and Quate set up an experiment to verify this theory, projecting an electron beam through the center of a toroidal resonant cavity. Their measurements confirmed Pierce's prediction, resulting in the famous Cutler-Quate experiment published in Physical Review in 1950, which became foundational for traveling wave tube research worldwide. Herwig Kogelnik later recalled that this paper was "our bible" for his Ph.D. thesis work in Vienna on reducing noise in traveling wave tubes.

=== Differential pulse-code modulation ===
At Murray Hill, Cutler frequently lunched with William M. Goodall, who was digitizing prefiltered television signals using pulse-code modulation with up to seven or eight bits per sample. Cutler realized that since each picture amplitude sample was very similar to the preceding one, encoding only the difference in signal amplitudes would require far fewer bits per sample. He further concluded that quantizing the difference between quantized signals would compensate for some quantization error, yielding a more accurate representation.

Based on these ideas, Cutler invented differential pulse-code modulation (DPCM), filing a patent on June 29, 1950, which was issued on July 29, 1952. DPCM became the foundation for many subsequent coding schemes. Today, predictive coding derived from his work is used in digital television transmission, fax machines, and medical imaging systems.

=== Satellite communications ===
The launch of Sputnik in 1957 generated great enthusiasm at Bell Labs for rocketry and spacecraft. Pierce wrote a classic paper on the potential of Earth satellites for communications, and Cutler wrote a technical memorandum titled "A Space Vehicle Communication System." With Pierce's approval, Cutler organized an ad hoc committee to study components necessary for a long-life radio repeater in an orbiting satellite, laying the groundwork for the Telstar experiment.

Early in 1958, NASA was planning to orbit a 100-foot-diameter aluminized Mylar balloon to measure atmospheric density in near space, and the agency was receptive to a passive communication experiment using the balloon as a reflector. Project Echo was soon underway, requiring transmitter-receiver stations at Bell Labs' Crawford Hill facility in New Jersey and the Jet Propulsion Laboratory facility at Goldstone, California.

On August 12, 1960, Echo 1 was launched into orbit. Cutler was present in the control room and personally started the tape containing President Eisenhower's recorded message for the first transmission. He later recalled, "It was probably the most exciting period in my life, because everything had to be done on the second. We had to have that antenna pointed exactly right, because this thing is whizzing from horizon to horizon in just 20 minutes." The experiment succeeded, demonstrating the first satellite relay of voice communications.

The horn antenna at Holmdel constructed for Project Echo was later used by Arno Penzias and Robert Woodrow Wilson for their 1964 discovery of cosmic microwave background radiation, which earned them the 1978 Nobel Prize in Physics.

=== Management positions at Bell Labs ===
Cutler was promoted to head of the Electronics Research Department in 1952, with responsibility for work on microwave electron tubes. He became assistant director of electronics research in 1959 and director of electronics systems research in 1963. From 1971 to 1978, he served as director of electronics and computer systems research. Over the years, hundreds of scientists reported to him. He famously hung the organization chart upside down in his office to remind himself that "those at the bottom of the chart were the important ones."

During his time as a director, Kogelnik recalled that during a budget crisis when no purchasing orders could be signed, Cutler personally assembled a current-controlled power supply using old vacuum tubes on a large wooden board and delivered it to Kogelnik, who desperately needed it to drive a laser.

Cutler also served as editor of IEEE Spectrum (1966–1967) and chairman of the IEEE Awards Board (1975–1976).

=== Stanford University (1979–2002) ===
After a 42-year career at Bell Labs, Cutler retired in 1979 to become a professor of applied physics at Stanford University, where his friend Calvin Quate also taught. Notably, he achieved this professorship despite never having completed a formal graduate degree, a testament to the exceptional reputation he had earned through his research contributions and his elections to the National Academy of Engineering and National Academy of Sciences. At Stanford, he continued to work on acoustic imaging.

While Quate and his students worked on the acoustic microscope, Cutler suggested a multibeam arrangement with several off-axis lenses distributed over a wide angle to circumvent the limit imposed by the small numerical aperture of a single lens. The wavelets emerging from the lenses acted constructively to form a coherent beam according to the Huygens–Fresnel principle. The improvement in imaging quality was striking, and Sol Buchsbaum, then executive director at Bell Labs, presented Cutler with a framed certificate showing acoustic microscope pictures before and after his innovation.

Cutler also served as visiting McKay Professor at the University of California, Berkeley in 1957, invited by Professor John R. Whinnery.

== Honors and awards ==
Cutler received numerous honors throughout his career:

- Honorary Doctor of Engineering, Worcester Polytechnic Institute (1975)
- IEEE Edison Medal (1981) – "For his creative contributions to microwave electronics, space communications, and technology of communication systems"
- Robert H. Goddard Alumni Award for Outstanding Personal Achievement, Worcester Polytechnic Institute (1982)
- IEEE Centennial Medal (1984)
- IEEE Alexander Graham Bell Medal (1991, with John O. Limb and Arun N. Netravali) – "For the invention and development of predictive coding of pictures and picture sequences"

He was elected to the National Academy of Engineering in 1970 and the National Academy of Sciences in 1976. He was a Fellow of the IEEE and the American Association for the Advancement of Science, and a member of Sigma Xi.

== Personal life ==
In the summer of 1934, while working as a chauffeur for a lawyer in Worcester, Cutler drove to Waterford, Maine, where he noticed two young women in bathing suits buying fish from a traveling fishmonger. He later met them at a party at the local community house, where he was particularly taken with Virginia Tyler, the pianist for the local orchestra. On September 27, 1941, Virginia Tyler and Chapin Cutler were married in Waterford, Maine, with about 100 people present including most of the village.

Cutler greatly enjoyed outdoor activities and was a Boy Scout leader who loved taking his children on adventures and teaching them survival skills. He hiked much of the Appalachian Trail with his childhood friend and climbed Mount Rainier with hiker Milt Boone. His most strenuous climb was to the summit of the Matterhorn with a Swiss team. He also took many adventurous hiking trips with Quate, including climbs of Mount Katahdin and Mount Banner in California, where they once had to sleep exposed on a slab of solid rock during a lightning storm.

Shortly after receiving the Alexander Graham Bell Medal in 1991, Cutler said in the WPI Journal: "I don't think I'm really that smart. I just think my imagination got turned on at an early age and that gave me tremendous motivation."

Cutler died on December 1, 2002, in North Reading, Massachusetts, at age 87. He was survived by his wife Virginia; son C. Chapin Cutler Jr.; daughter Virginia Raymond; and four grandchildren.

== Selected publications ==
- Cutler, C. C. (1947). "Parabolic antenna design for microwaves". Proceedings of the IRE. 35 (11): 1284–1294. doi:10.1109/JRPROC.1947.232106.
- Cutler, C. C.; Quate, C. F. (1950). "Experimental verification of space charge and transit time reduction of noise in electron beams". Physical Review. 80 (5): 875–878. Bibcode:1950PhRv...80..875C. doi:10.1103/PhysRev.80.875.
- Cutler, C. C. (1951). "The calculation of traveling-wave-tube gain". Proceedings of the IRE. 39 (8): 914–917. doi:10.1109/JRPROC.1951.273730.
- Crawford, A. B.; Cutler, C. C.; Kompfner, R.; Tillotson, L. C. (1963). "The research background of the Telstar experiment". Bell System Technical Journal. 42 (4): 747–751. doi:10.1002/j.1538-7305.1963.tb00530.x.
- Bond, W. L.; Cutler, C. C.; Lemons, R. A.; Quate, C. F. (1975). "Dark-field and stereo viewing with the acoustic microscope". Applied Physics Letters. 27 (5): 270–272. Bibcode:1975ApPhL..27..270B. doi:10.1063/1.88446.

Awards
Preceded by Paul Baran	IEEE Alexander Graham Bell Medal; 1991 with Arun Netravali and John O. Limb	Succeeded by James Massey
