= Gioia Marconi Braga =

American foundation founder (1916–1996)

Gioia Marconi Braga, daughter of Guglielmo Marconi and his first wife, The Hon. Beatrice O'Brien (1882–1976, the daughter of the 14th Baron Inchiquin), was the founder and chairwoman of the Marconi Foundation, now known as the Marconi Society.

Born on April 10, 1916, in London, Braga was a longtime resident of Alpine, New Jersey.

After coming to the United States for a visit in February 1952, Braga decided to stay. In April 1952 she began working on the production staff at NBC Radio. Her responsibilities there included two segments of Collectors' Item, a Sunday morning program. Two years later she married and left NBC to enter a "world of wealth and travel", which was disrupted by the Cuban Revolution.

In 1974, Braga founded the Marconi Society and raised "enough money to ensure its survival long past her death".

Braga was a Christian Scientist. She was married to sugar company executive George A. Braga, who died in 1985. They had a son and a daughter. She died on July 15, 1996.
