= John Limb =

Australian engineer

John O. Limb is an Australian engineer, known for fundamental contributions to the development of digital video communications and holder of a series of patents related to computer communications.

== Early life and education ==
Born in Western Australia, he received a Bachelor of Electrical Engineering (B.E.E.) (1963) and a Ph.D. on the thesis Vision Oriented Coding of Visual Signal (1967), both from the University of Western Australia. Limb studied the human vision's role in the encoding of picture, partially under the direction of Dr. Albert Seyler and Professor Zig Budrikis.

== Career ==
He worked as researcher at the Postmaster-General's Department's research laboratory in Melbourne (1966–67) before moving to New Jersey where he joined Bell Labs (1967), being manager of the department for visual communications research (1971–78) leading to patents. He then led the research department for distributed computer systems (1978–84) before going to Bellcore research where Limb was in charge of developing the new research division for communications sciences (1984–86) where he among other projects, developed medium access control protocols for local area networks. Later he joined Hewlett Packard as director of laboratories in Bristol, England (1986–89), for the technology analysis group at Cupertino, California (1989) and for the media technology group (1992–94). Distributed Computer Systems Research Department where the emphasis was on office information systems and local/metropolitan area networks. Recently, he has worked on optical communication systems at Broadcom, working at Atlanta, Georgia.

He has held visiting professorships at the Technical University of Hannover (1975), the University of Sydney (1983), and the University of Essex (1985–86).

Limb started at the Georgia Institute of Technology in 1994 as a Georgia Research Alliance Eminent Scholar in Advanced Telecommunications. He joined the faculty staff of both the Networking & Telecommunications Group in the College of Computing, and the School of Electrical and Computer Engineering in the College of Engineering. He created the Georgia Tech Broadband Telecommunications Center in 1995.

== Publications ==
- Advances in local area networks (IEEE press, 1987)

== Awards and honors ==
- 1978 IEEE Fellow
- 1973 IEEE Communications Society "Leonard G. Abraham Prize" for best paper in the field of communications systems
- 1982 IEEE Donald G. Fink Prize Paper Award for the best review paper published in the Proceedings of the IEEE in 1980
- 1991 IEEE Alexander Graham Bell Medal, along with C. Chapin Cutler and Arun N. Netravali

Awards
| Preceded by Paul Baran | IEEE Alexander Graham Bell Medal; 1991 with C. Chapin Cutler and Arun Netravali | Succeeded by James Massey |
