= IEEE Alexander Graham Bell Medal =

Technical award

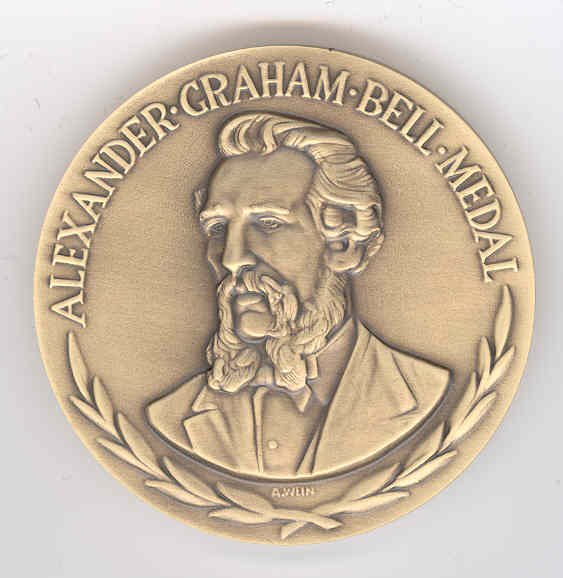
- Awarded for: Exceptional contributions to communications and networking sciences and engineering
- Country: (United States) USA
- Presented by: IEEE
- First award: 1976
- Website: IEEE Alexander Graham Bell Medal

The IEEE Alexander Graham Bell Medal is an award honoring "exceptional contributions to communications and networking sciences and engineering" in the field of telecommunications. The medal is one of the highest honors awarded by the Institute of Electrical and Electronics Engineers (IEEE) for achievements in telecommunication sciences and engineering.

It was instituted in 1976 by the directors of IEEE, commemorating the centennial of the invention of the telephone by Alexander Graham Bell. The award is presented either to an individual, or to a team of two or three persons.

The institute's reasoning for the award was described thus:

The invention of the telephone by Alexander Graham Bell in 1876 was a major event in electrotechnology. It was instrumental in stimulating the broad telecommunications industry that has dramatically improved life throughout the world. As an individual, Bell himself exemplified the contributions that scientists and engineers have made to the betterment of mankind.

Recipients of the award receive a gold medal, bronze replica, certificate, and an honorarium.

== Recipients ==
As listed by the IEEE:

- 1976 Amos E. Joel, Jr., William Keister, and Raymond W. Ketchledge
- 1977 Eberhardt Rechtin
- 1978 M. Robert Aaron, John S. Mayo, and Eric E. Sumner
- 1979 A. Christian Jacobaeus
- 1980 Richard R. Hough
- 1981 David Slepian
- 1982 Harold A. Rosen
- 1983 Stephen O. Rice
- 1984 Andrew J. Viterbi
- 1985 Charles K. Kao
- 1986 Bernard Widrow
- 1987 Joel S. Engel, Richard H. Frenkiel, and William C. Jakes, Jr.
- 1988 Robert M. Metcalfe
- 1989 Gerald R. Ash and Billy B. Oliver
- 1990 Paul Baran
- 1991 C. Chapin Cutler, John O. Limb, and Arun N. Netravali
- 1992 James L. Massey
- 1993 Donald C. Cox
- 1994 Hiroshi Inose
- 1995 Irwin M. Jacobs
- 1996 Tadahiro Sekimoto
- 1997 Vinton G. Cerf and Robert E. Kahn
- 1998 Richard E. Blahut
- 1999 David G. Messerschmitt
- 2000 Vladimir A. Kotelnikov
- 2001 no award
- 2002 Tsuneo Nakahara
- 2003 Joachim Hagenauer
- 2004 no award
- 2005 Jim K. Omura
- 2006 John Wozencraft
- 2007 Norman Abramson
- 2008 Gerard J. Foschini
- 2009 Robert McEliece
- 2010 John Cioffi
- 2011 Arogyaswami Paulraj
- 2012 Leonard Kleinrock
- 2013 Andrew Chraplyvy, Robert Tkach
- 2014 Dariush Divsalar
- 2015 Frank Kelly
- 2016 Roberto Padovani
- 2017 H. Vincent Poor
- 2018 Nambirajan Seshadri
- 2019 Teresa H. Meng
- 2020 Rajiv Laroia
- 2021 Nicholas W. McKeown
- 2022 Panganamala R. Kumar
- 2023 Erwin Hochmair, Ingeborg Hochmair
- 2024 Jennifer Rexford
- 2025 Richard D. Gitlin
- 2026 Scott Shenker

== See also ==
- Alexander Graham Bell honors and tributes
- Donald Davies – independently invented packet switching and modern data communication
- IEEE Medal of Honor
- IEEE awards
- World Communication Awards
