= Gerald Ash =

American electrical engineer

Gerald R. Ash
- Born: August 1, 1942; Paterson, New Jersey
- Education: California Institute of Technology; Rutgers University
- Known for: Dynamic Non-Hierarchical Routing
- Awards: IEEE Alexander Graham Bell Medal (1989)
- Scientific career
- Workplaces: Bell Labs
- Thesis: Optimal guidance of low-thrust interplanetary space vehicles (1969)
- Doctoral advisor: Rangasami Sridhar

Gerald R. Ash (born August 1, 1942) is an American retired electrical engineer who worked at Bell Labs. His research has focused on routing problems; he is known for the development of Dynamic Non-Hierarchical Routing (DNHR).

== Biography ==
Ash received his B.S. in electrical engineering in 1964 from Rutgers University. He attended graduate school at the California Institute of Technology, where he earned his M.S. in 1965 and PhD in 1969, both in electrical engineering. He joined Bell Labs in 1972.

In 1989 Ash was awarded the IEEE Alexander Graham Bell Medal, together with Billy B. Oliver, for their work on DNHR.

In 1993, Ash was elevated to IEEE fellow for contribution to the conception and implementation of dynamic routing in telecommunication networks.

In 2001 Ash was inducted into the New Jersey Inventors Hall of Fame for his unique contributions to the telecommunications industry by inventing three dynamic routing schemes, which were patented from 1982 to 1995.

Ash is the author of three books, "Dynamic Routing in Telecommunications Networks" (1997) "Traffic Engineering and QoS Optimization of Integrated Voice & Data Networks (Morgan Kaufmann Series in Networking)" (2006) "Katy's Astonishing Adventures With Tortulus T.Turtle" by Gerald Ash and Katy Chew" (2009)

Awards
Preceded by Robert M. Metcalfe	IEEE Alexander Graham Bell Medal; 1989 with Billy B. Oliver	Succeeded by Paul Baran
