= Robert Kahn (computer scientist) =

American Internet pioneer (born 1938)

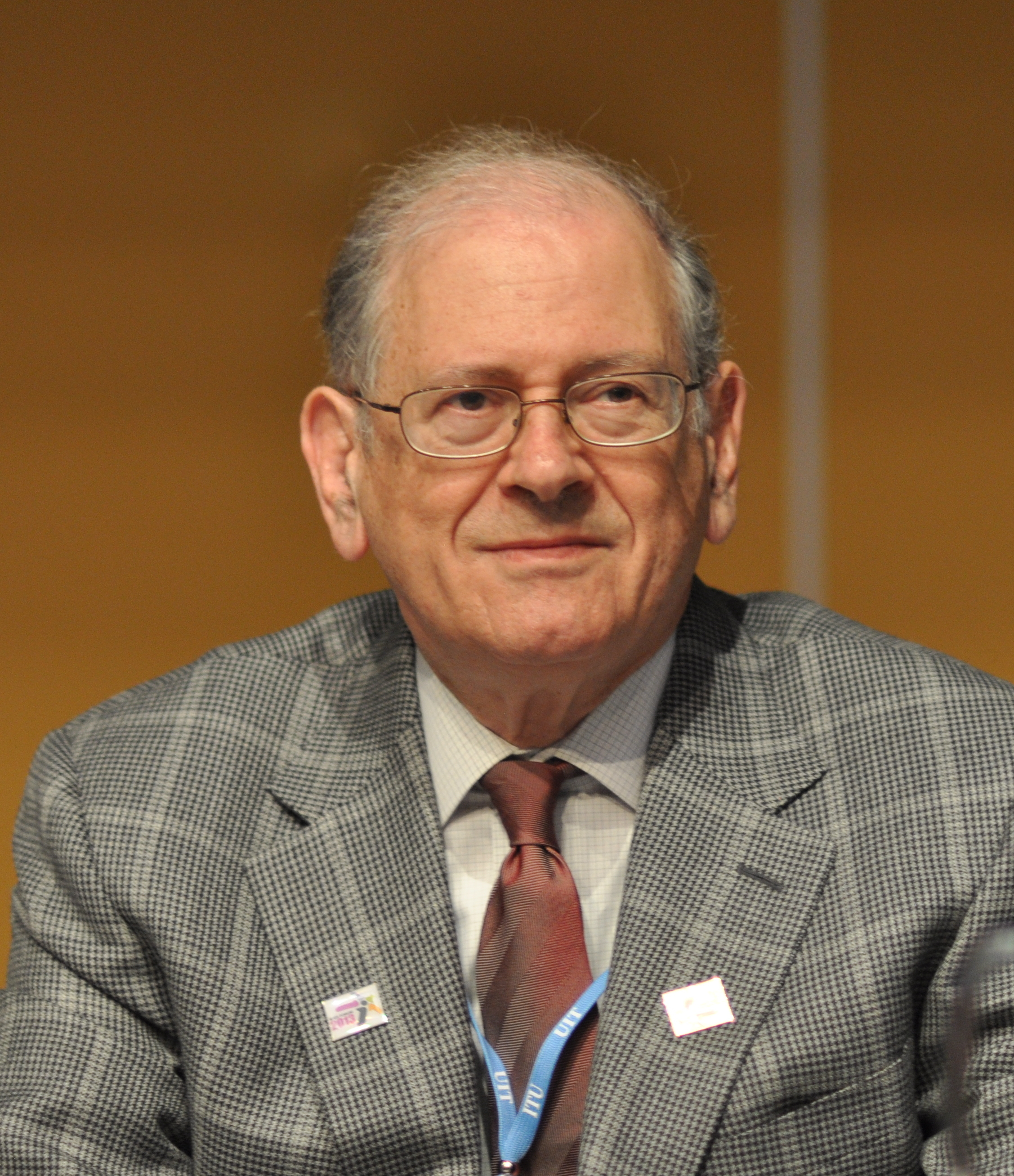
- Kahn in Geneva, May 2013
- Born: Robert Elliot Kahn; December 23, 1938 (age 87); New York City, U.S.
- Education: City College of New York (BS); Princeton University (MA, PhD)
- Known for: TCP/IP
- Spouse: Patrice Ann Lyons
- Awards: Marconi Prize (1994); National Medal of Tech (1997); National Medal of Technology and Innovation (1997); IEEE Alexander Graham Bell Medal (1997); Charles Stark Draper Prize (2001); Prince of Asturias Award (2002); Turing Award (2004); Presidential Medal of Freedom (2005); Computer History Museum Fellow (2006); Japan Prize (2008); Harold Pender Award (2010); Queen Elizabeth Prize for Engineering (2013); IEEE Medal of Honor (2024)
- Scientific career
- Fields: Telecommunications, networking
- Workplaces: Bell Labs; MIT; BBN; DARPA; Corporation for National Research Initiatives
- Thesis: Some problems in the sampling and modulation of signals (1964)
- Doctoral advisor: Bede Liu

Robert Elliot Kahn (born December 23, 1938) is an American electrical engineer who, along with Vint Cerf, first proposed the Transmission Control Protocol (TCP) and the Internet Protocol (IP), the fundamental communication protocols at the heart of the Internet.

In 2004, Kahn won the Turing Award with Vint Cerf for their work on TCP/IP.

== Early life and education ==
Robert Elliot Kahn was born in December 1938 in Brooklyn, New York City to parents Beatrice Pauline (née Tashker) and Lawrence Kahn in an Ashkenazi Jewish family. Through his father, he is related to futurist Herman Kahn. After receiving a bachelor's in electrical engineering from the City College of New York in 1960, Kahn went on to Princeton University where he earned a M.A. in 1962 and Ph.D. in 1964, both in electrical engineering. At Princeton, he was advised by Bede Liu and completed a doctoral dissertation titled "Some problems in the sampling and modulation of signals."

== Career ==
Kahn first worked at Bolt Beranek and Newman Inc., where he was the principal designer of the ARPANET. In the fall of 1972, he demonstrated the ARPANET by connecting 20 different computers at the International Conference on Computer Communications (ICCC), "the watershed event that made people suddenly realize that packet switching was a real technology."

In 1972, Kahn joined the Information Processing Techniques Office (IPTO) within DARPA. He then helped develop the TCP/IP protocols for connecting diverse computer networks. After he became director of IPTO, he started the United States government's billion dollar Strategic Computing Initiative, the largest computer research and development program ever undertaken by the U.S. federal government.

After thirteen years with DARPA, Kahn left to found the Corporation for National Research Initiatives (CNRI) in 1986, and as of 2022 remains its chairman, CEO and president.

== The Internet ==
While working on the SATNET satellite packet network project, he came up with the initial ideas for what later became the Transmission Control Protocol (TCP), which was intended as a replacement for an earlier network protocol, NCP, used in the ARPANET. TCP played a major role in forming the basis of internetworking, which would allow computers and networks all over the world to communicate with each other, regardless of what hardware or software the computers on each network used. To reach this goal, TCP was designed to have the following features:

- Small sub-sections of the whole network would be able to talk to each other through a specialized computer that only forwarded packets (first called a gateway, and now called a router).
- No portion of the network would be the single point of failure, or would be able to control the whole network.
- Each piece of information sent through the network would be given a sequence number, to ensure that they were dealt with in the right order at the destination computer, and to detect the loss of any of them.
- A computer which sent information to another computer would know that it was successfully received when the destination computer sent back a special packet, called an acknowledgement (ACK), for that particular piece of information.
- If information sent from one computer to another was lost, the information would be retransmitted, after the loss was detected by a timeout, which would recognize that the expected acknowledgement had not been received.
- Each piece of information sent through the network would be accompanied by a checksum, calculated by the original sender, and checked by the ultimate receiver, to ensure that it was not damaged in any way en route.

Vint Cerf joined him on the project in the spring of 1973, and together they completed an early version of TCP. Later, the protocol was separated into two separate layers: host-to-host communication would be handled by TCP, with Internet Protocol (IP) handling internetwork communication. The two together are usually referred to as TCP/IP, and form part of the basis for the modern Internet.

In 1992 he co-founded with Vint Cerf the Internet Society, to provide leadership in Internet related standards, education, and policy.

== Awards ==
In 1981, Bob Kahn was elevated to the grade of IEEE fellow for original work in packet switching mobile radio telecommunications technology. He was elected as a member to the National Academy of Engineering in 1987 for research contributions in computer networks and packet switching, and for creative management contributions to research efforts in computers and communications. He was elected a Founding Fellow of Association for the Advancement of Artificial Intelligence in 1990.

He was awarded the SIGCOMM Award in 1993 for "visionary technical contributions and leadership in the development of information systems technology", and shared the 2004 Turing Award with Vint Cerf, for "pioneering work on internetworking, including .. the Internet's basic communications protocols .. and for inspired leadership in networking."

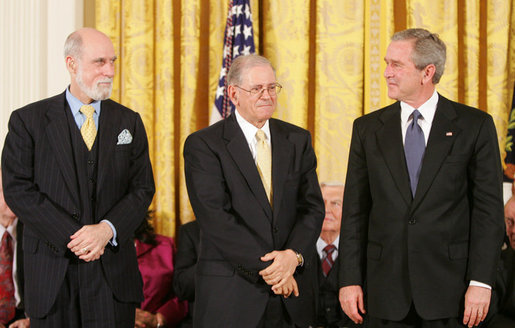
Vint Cerf and Robert Kahn being awarded the Presidential Medal Of Freedom by President Bush

He is a recipient of the AFIPS Harry Goode Memorial Award, the Marconi Award, the ACM SIGCOMM Award, the President's Award from ACM, the IEEE Koji Kobayashi Computer and Communications Award, the IEEE Alexander Graham Bell Medal, the IEEE Third Millennium Medal, the ACM Software Systems Award, the Computerworld/Smithsonian Award, the ASIS Special Award and the Public Service Award from the Computing Research Board. He has twice received the Secretary of Defense Civilian Service Award.

He was awarded an honorary degree by the University of Pavia in 1998.

He was awarded the Stibitz-Wilson Award from the American Computer & Robotics Museum in 1999 for Pioneering the Internet through Major Design and Development Contributor to the Original ARPANET NCP Protocol and Co-Inventor of the Internet's TCP/IP Protocol.

He is a recipient of the 1997 National Medal of Technology, the 2001 Charles Stark Draper Prize from the National Academy of Engineering, the 2002 Prince of Asturias Award, and the 2004 A. M. Turing Award from the Association for Computing Machinery. Kahn received the 2003 Digital ID World award for the Digital Object Architecture as a significant contribution (technology, policy or social) to the digital identity industry.

In 2005 he was awarded the Townsend Harris Medal from the Alumni Association of the City College of New York, the Presidential Medal of Freedom, and the C & C Prize in Tokyo, Japan.

He was inducted into the National Inventors Hall of Fame in May 2006.

He was inducted as a Fellow of the Computer History Museum in 2006 "for pioneering technical contributions to internetworking and for leadership in the application of networks to scientific research."

He was awarded the 2008 Japan Prize for his work in "Information Communication Theory and Technology" (together with Vinton Cerf).

- In 2001, he was inducted as a Fellow of the Association for Computing Machinery.
- Robert Kahn and Vinton Cerf were each inducted as an Honorary Fellow of the Society for Technical Communication (STC) in May 2006.

The duo were also awarded with the Harold Pender Award, the highest honor awarded by the University of Pennsylvania School Engineering and Applied Sciences, in February 2010.

He has also served on the board of directors for Qualcomm.

In 2012, Kahn was inducted into the Internet Hall of Fame by the Internet Society.

In 2013, Kahn was one of five Internet and Web pioneers awarded the inaugural Queen Elizabeth Prize for Engineering.

Kahn received the 2024 IEEE Medal of Honor for "pioneering technical and leadership contributions in packet communication technologies and foundations of the Internet."

== Honorary degrees ==
Kahn has received honorary degrees from Princeton University, University of Pavia, ETH Zurich, University of Maryland, George Mason University, the University of Central Florida and the University of Pisa, and an honorary fellowship from University College, London.

In 2012, he was also recognized as honorary doctor of Saint Petersburg National Research University of Information Technologies, Mechanics and Optics.

== Articles ==
- Vint Cerf & Bob Kahn, Al Gore and the Internet, 2000-09-28

== See also ==
- History of the Internet
- International Network Working Group
- List of Internet pioneers
- List of pioneers in computer science
- Paul Baran and Donald Davies, independently invented packet-switched networks
- Protocol Wars

Awards and achievements
Preceded by Tadahiro Sekimoto	IEEE Alexander Graham Bell Medal; 1997 with Vint Cerf	Succeeded by Richard Blahut
