= Ricochet (Internet service) =

Former wireless Internet access service in the United States

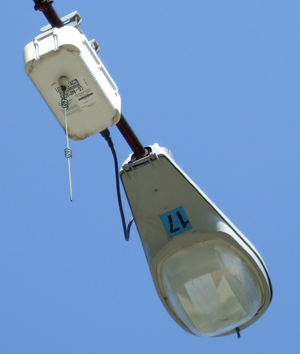
A Ricochet pole-top radio in suburban Detroit (similar looking devices are used by the Wireless Oakland project, which overlaps part of the Detroit ricochet market)

Ricochet was one of the first wireless Internet access services in the United States, before Wi-Fi, 3G, and other technologies were available to the general public. It was developed and first offered by Metricom Incorporated, which shut down in 2001. The service was originally known as the Micro Cellular Data Network, or MCDN, gaining the Ricochet name when the service was launched to the public.

== History ==
Metricom was founded in 1985, initially selling radios to electric, gas, oil, and water industrial customers. The company was founded by Dr. David M. Elliott and Paul Baran.

Paul Allen took a controlling stake in Metricom in 1997. Service began in 1994 in Cupertino, California, and was deployed throughout Silicon Valley (the northern part of Santa Clara Valley) by 1995, the rest of the San Francisco Bay Area by 1996, and to other cities throughout the end of the 1990s. By this time, the service was operating at roughly the speed of a 56 kbit/s dialup modem. Ricochet introduced a higher-speed 128 kbit/s, service in 1999, however, monthly fees for this service were more than double those for the original service.

In June of 2021, MCI WorldCom and Vulcan Ventures, controlled by Mr. Allen, each invested an additional $300 million in Metricom to fund network expansion. MCI WorldCom also agreed to market the Ricochet service to its customers.

At its height in early 2001, Ricochet service was available in many areas, including Atlanta, Baltimore, and Dallas. Over 51,000 subscribers paid for the service. In July 2001, however, Ricochet's owner, Metricom, filed for Chapter 11 bankruptcy and shut down its service. Like many companies during the dot-com boom, Metricom had spent more money than it took in and concentrated on a nationwide rollout and marketing instead of developing select markets.

Ricochet was reportedly officially utilized in the immediate disaster recovery situation of the September 11, 2001 terrorist attacks, partially operated by former employees as volunteers, when even cell phone networks were overloaded.

=== Aftermath ===
After bankruptcy, in November 2001, Aerie Networks, a Denver-based broadband firm, purchased the assets of the company at a liquidation sale. Service was restored to Denver in August 2002, and to San Diego in November 2002. Aerie sold Ricochet to EDL Holdings in 2003, who then sold it to YDI Wireless in 2004. YDI Wireless changed its name to Terabeam Inc., and Ricochet then operated as a subsidiary of Terabeam. Terabeam announced no plans for expansion. During the bankruptcy, ownership of the Ricochet radio transmitters had reverted to the municipalities where the radios were installed, so any expansion would have required Ricochet to renegotiate agreements with the cities or counties in question. In the meantime, wireless data services carried over the cellular telephone network had become more popular, making the value of Ricochet technology unclear. In March 2006, there were about 8,000 subscribers between the two markets. In August 2007 the Ricochet service was acquired by Civitas Wireless Solutions LLC. Ricochet notified its Denver customers on March 28, 2008, that service would cease the next day. Civitas liquidated itself in February 2009 after bankruptcy.

== Technology ==
The technology, deployed by Metricom Inc., worked as a wireless mesh network: packets were forwarded by small repeaters (typically mounted on streetlights, for the use of which Metricom negotiated agreements with municipal governments) and might "bounce" among several such units along the path between an end-user's modem and a wired internet access point; hence the name of the service. The wireless ISP service was an outgrowth of technology Metricom had developed to facilitate remote meter reading for utility companies. It was originally inspired by amateur packet radio, but differed from this technology in many respects: for instance, Ricochet used spread spectrum (FHSS) technology in the low-power "license-free" 900 MHz ISM band of the RF spectrum. In addition to the resistance to eavesdropping offered by FHSS, modems offered built-in encryption, but this was not turned on by default.

Throughput was originally advertised as equivalent to, and in practice was often somewhat better than, that of a then-standard 28.8 kbit/s telephone modem. In addition, Ricochet could be treated as an "always-on" connection (in the sense that, once connected to the network, it could stay connected even when not in use without tying up scarce resources, unlike a dialup connection), much the way broadband is today. It was also marketed for a flat monthly fee (the original Ricochet service was $29.95 a month, less than the cost of dialup plus a second phone line). As a result, a significant number of users in the Ricochet service area adopted it as their primary home Internet connection.

Ricochet's main draw, however, was that it was wireless; at the time, there were almost no other options for a wireless Internet connection. Cellular phones were not as prevalent as today, and wireless data services such as GPRS had not yet been deployed on US cellular networks. It was possible to use specially adapted dialup modems over cellular connections, but this was slow (typically topping out at 9.6 kbit/s), expensive (per-minute charges applied), and often unreliable. In contrast, Ricochet was fast, flat-rate, and very reliable.

=== Equipment ===
The consumer equipment uses license-free 1 W 900 MHz FHSS encrypted radio modems which respond to standard Hayes "AT" commands. They include a packet-based mode of operation called "star mode", and it is possible to create a point-to-point connection or even a small independent network with data speeds greater than 256 kbit/s. Some of the infrastructure equipment used 900 MHz for the link to the consumer and used 2.4 GHz for the backhaul link. (A third option, the licensed 2.3 GHz WCS band, was used only in heavily loaded parts of the network and is seldom mentioned in literature).
