= Wireless Oakland =

White: unincorporated townships Gray: incorporated cities and villages

Wireless Oakland was an initiative in Oakland County, Michigan to blanket the County's 910 square miles (2,400 km^{2}) with wireless Internet service.

== Rollout ==
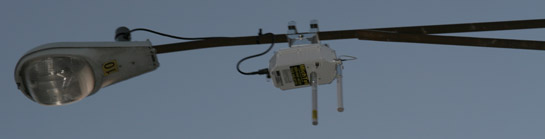
One of Wireless Oakland poletop radios. (Similar looking devices were used by Ricochet internet service. Oakland county happens to be one of the few places ricochet was rolled out)

Wireless Oakland enabled Internet service providers to install WiFi transmitters on public infrastructures (such as telephone poles and radio towers). The county's private-sector partners owned, operated and maintained the project.

The poletop radios provided access to the network, SSID "Wireless Oakland", which greets the user with a login page. Free internet service was being offered at a 128 kbit/s by MichTel Communications, which was to charge fees for additional download speeds and services.

As of May 2007, the phase I pilot was operational in seven communities: Troy, Birmingham, Oak Park, Royal Oak, Madison Heights, Pontiac and Wixom.

== Shutdown ==
Due to difficult economic times, MichTel Communications was unable to secure funding to continue wireless internet service to the Phase One Communities and to deploy wireless internet service to the remaining portions of the county. As a result of the lacking of funding, the contract between the county and MichTel Communications expired.
