= Tadahiro Sekimoto =

Japanese electronics engineer (1926–2007)

Tadahiro Sekimoto 関本忠弘
- Born: November 14, 1926; Hyōgo Prefecture, Japan
- Died: November 11, 2007 (aged 80)
- Education: University of Tokyo
- Awards: IEEE Medal of Honor (2004); IEEE Alexander Graham Bell Medal; KBE; NAE; IEEE Fellow
- Scientific career
- Fields: Electrical engineering

Tadahiro Sekimoto (関本忠弘, Sekimoto Tadahiro; November 14, 1926 – November 11, 2007) was a Japanese electronics engineer, a recipient of the IEEE Medal of Honor (2004), chairman of Japan's Institute for International Socio-Economic Studies (IISE), and former chairman of the Board of Councilors of the Japan Federation of Economic Organizations (Keidanren) who served as president and later chairman of Japan's NEC Corporation (NEC). Born in Hyōgo, Japan, Sekimoto earned his BS in physics in 1948 and his Doctor of Engineering degree in 1962 at the University of Tokyo.

On 11 November 2007, he died after a series of strokes.

== Corporate career ==
Sekimoto joined NEC, now a globally active Japanese information technologies conglomerate and member of the Sumitomo Group, in 1948. He started his career at the company's Central Research Laboratories, where he advanced to chief of basic research in 1965. In August 1965 he was appointed to a two-year assignment at COMSAT in Washington, DC, where he engaged in research on digital transmission technologies used in satellite communications. On his return to NEC in 1967, Sekimoto was appointed to manage the company's Communications Research Laboratory. He rose to general manager of NEC's Transmission Division in 1972 and, in 1974, was elected to the NEC board of directors. He was appointed senior vice president in 1977 and executive vice president with portfolio for sales in Japan in 1978. In this position, he enhanced the company's sales operations in the Japanese domestic market by creating structures conducive to marketing mass-produced electronics products. In 1980, Sekimoto was appointed president of NEC and launched NEC's C&C concept for integrating computers and communications, which resulted in significant sales increases. Finally, Sekimoto served as chairman of the board from 1994 to 1998, when he resigned from the post (as well as from his chairmanship of the Keidanren Board of Councilors) to apologize for NEC's role in a scandal involving the Japan Defense Agency, Japan's de facto defence ministry.

== Contributions to communications technologies ==
Sekimoto, in addition the accomplishments of his corporate career, made significant contributions to the advancement of communications technologies over more than 50 years. During his 17 years at NEC's Central Research Laboratories he designed early pulse-code modulation equipment down to the coding and decoding circuitry. During his two years at COMSAT, he set up a communications processing laboratory and oversaw or helped oversee numerous projects covering voice-, data-, and video-processing technologies, including the development of single-channel-per-carrier pulse-code-modulation multiple-access demand-assignment equipment and assigned it the acronym SPADE because "the ace of the spades in card games was regarded as almighty". Later, in the early 1970s, Intelsat commercialized SPADE technology, which is credited with allowing developing countries to join global networks by making satellite communications affordable to them. A time-division multiple access (TDMA) system and an automatic routing system Sekimoto developed were not only hugely significant for satellite communications, but also became indispensable elements of cellular mobile communications thirty years on. Seminal in their day, many technologies and applications Sekimoto worked on at NEC and COMSAT are integral to modern telecommunications systems, and they helped lay the groundwork for the global networks that many societies now depend on.

Sekimoto has also authored numerous works, both technical publications and books written for a wider audience, and he has 35 Japanese and five non-Japanese patents to his credit.

== Recognition for accomplishments ==
Sekimoto, an IEEE Life Fellow and a foreign associate of the National Academy of Engineering in the U.S., has been recognized for his contributions to communications with numerous awards. In addition to its Medal of Honor, the IEEE also awarded him its Alexander Graham Bell Medal, and he is a recipient of the IEEE Communication Society's Edwin Howard Armstrong Award. He has also received the American Institute of Astronautics and Aeronautics’ Aerospace Communications Award. He was appointed a Chevalier of the Legion of Honour of France in 1995 and an honorary Knight Commander of the Order of the British Empire (KBE) in 1996. The Japanese government honoured him with a Medal of Honor with Purple Ribbon in 1982 and the Grand Cordon of the Order of the Sacred Treasure in 1997; he was posthumously granted the third degree of precedence in official rank in 2007.

When speaking, Sekimoto invariably credits his mentor, Koji Kobayashi—also an engineer who served as president and then chairman of NEC, for inspiring him to pursue his interests. Sekimoto was lately active in promoting research on relations between Japan and other countries and ways to solve Japan's own social problems through his role at the IISE.

== Awards and honors ==
- Medal with Purple Ribbon (1982)
- Medal with Blue Ribbon (1989)
- Légion d'honneur (1995)
- IEEE Alexander Graham Bell Medal (1996)
- Knight Commander of the Most Excellent Order of the British Empire (KBE) (1996)
- Order of the Sacred Treasure, 1st class (1997)
- IEEE Medal of Honor (2004)

Awards
Preceded by Irwin M. Jacobs	IEEE Alexander Graham Bell Medal; 1996	Succeeded by Vint Cerf and Bob Kahn
