= Eberhardt Rechtin =

American aerospace engineer (1926–2006)

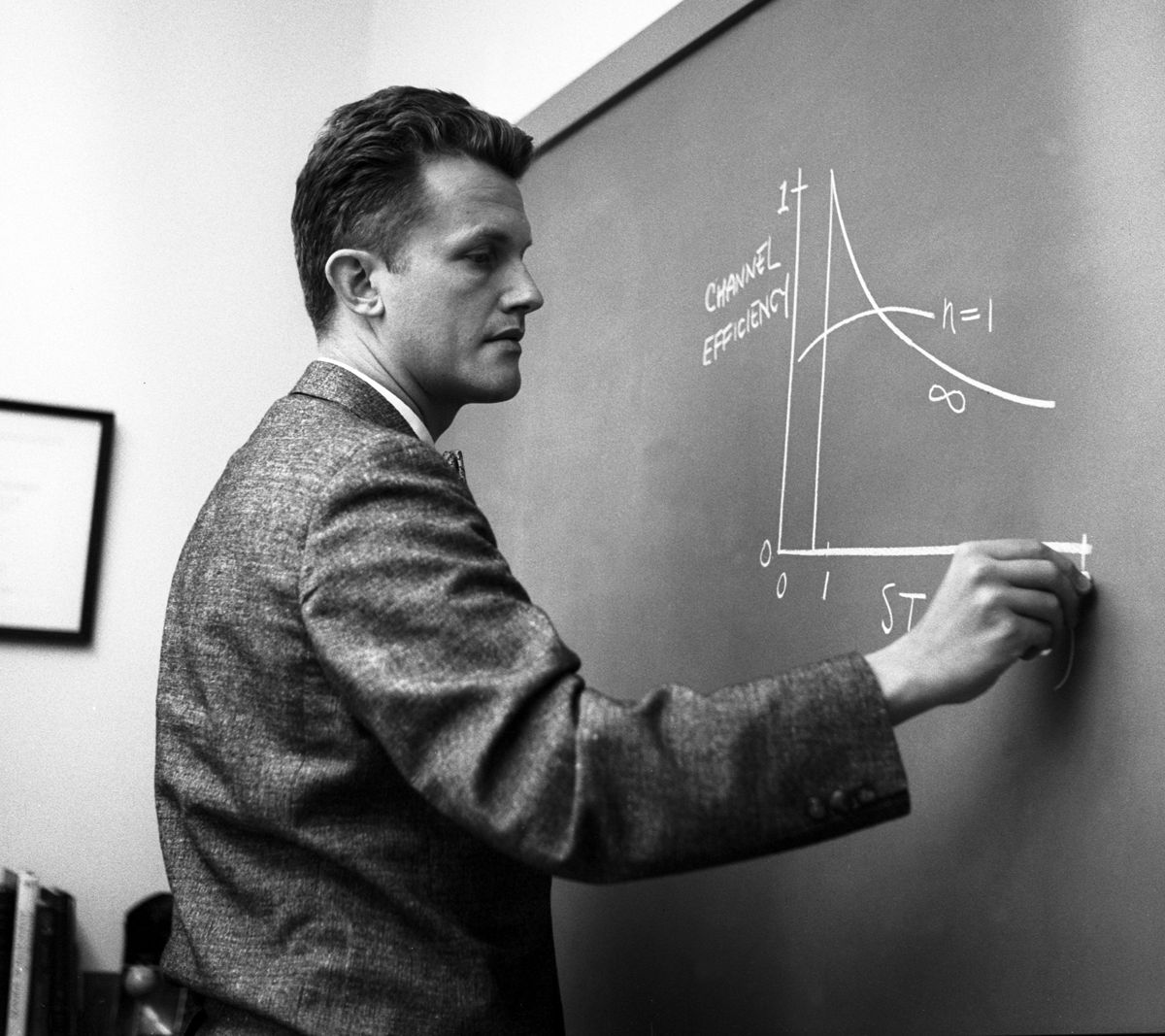
Eberhardt Rechtin, in September 1960, when he was Chief of the Electronics Research Section of the Jet Propulsion Laboratory

Eberhardt Rechtin (January 16, 1926 – April 14, 2006) was an American systems engineer and respected authority in aerospace systems and systems architecture.

== Biography ==
Eberhardt Rechtin was born in East Orange, New Jersey on January 16, 1926. He served in the U.S. Navy on active duty from 1943 to 1946 and continued as a reserve officer until 1958. He completed his undergraduate work at the California Institute of Technology during his Navy service. He received his doctorate in electrical engineering, also from Caltech, in 1950. He was a founding father of systems architecture as a distinct discipline.

While at Caltech, and for many years after receiving his degree, Rechtin worked at the Jet Propulsion Laboratory. It was here where he was introduced to the new mathematics of noise, statistical communications and servomechanism stability by Dr. William H. Pickering and others. The Laboratory was then working on problems of radio guidance and telemetry of missiles, subsequently converted and extended to telecommunications and tracking for deep space vehicles. He was instrumental in extending the mathematical foundations to phase locked systems operating in severe jamming and noise conditions, to coded digital transmission, and to communicating with high velocity vehicles. By the late 1950s, these developments were applied to the U.S. space program. Rechtin is often referred to as the “Father of the Deep Space Network”, the resulting world-wide network of stations developed by NASA/JPL to track and acquire data from the spacecraft. Rechtin served as director of the project and Assistant Director of the JPL.

During Rechtin's years at JPL, he also worked with NATO's Advisory Group on Aeronautical Research and Development, helping the defense organization develop space applications. He continued his role on NATO committees in research and telecommunications when he moved to the Department of Defense.

At the Department of Defense, Rechtin became the Director of the Advanced Research Projects Agency, (later known as the Defense Advanced Research Projects Agency (DARPA). During this era of the Vietnam War, anything connected to the defense department was viewed with suspicion. Not only were ARPA programs frequently being cut, but the existence of the entire agency was at risk. Rechtin was able to successfully lobby Congress to maintain funding by deleting expensive "damn fool" programs, such as a mechanical Trojan Horse for use in the Vietnam Jungles. In its place, Rechtin placed funds toward the continued research and development of secure peer-to-peer communications for military forces in the field. This technology was known as the ARPANET – the backbone code of which would evolve into what we know today as TCP/IP protocols, and, of more importance, the underlying structure of the Internet.

In 1970 he became the principal deputy in the office of the director of Defense Research and Engineering, and then the Assistant Secretary of Defense for Telecommunications. During his time at the Department of Defense, he was concerned with policy formulation and implementation in defense research and engineering and in defense telecommunications. In his later years, this included the development of policies for defense telecommunications satellites, secure communications, network interoperability, survivability under attack, and responsiveness to the National Command Authority, all of which became central to the era's Defense Communications System

Rechtin left the government to take a position at Hewlett Packard as chief engineer in 1973. During the 1970s, he also served as a Director of the Planning Research Corporation and as chairman of the Chief of Naval Operations CJ Advisory Committee. He remained at Hewlett Packard only a few years before moving on to The Aerospace Corporation in 1977. His new employer had been founded in 1960 as a non-profit corporation to “serve the Air Force in the scientific and technical planning and management of its missile space programs.” At The Aerospace Corporation, Rechtin was responsible for the growth of the company's work on space programs related to national security, including work for the Air Force on a Global Positioning System. He also led work on advanced weather, communications, early warning, and missile defense capabilities. His years in the Department of Defense helped strengthen the company's relationship with the Air Force. He retired from the company in 1987, but retained his association as President Emeritus.

Upon leaving the Aerospace Corporation, Rechtin joined the University of Southern California as professor of industrial and systems engineering, aerospace engineering, and electrical engineering systems. He was an early developer of systems architecture design as an academic discipline, establishing the university's first program in the subject, and writing a number of books to teach the discipline. He was a co-founder of National Council on Systems Engineering (NCOSE) with Jeff Grady and others, which became INCOSE in 1995. In 1994, he retired, but remained at the University as Professor Emeritus.

Rechtin received numerous honors throughout his career including the Department of Defense Distinguished Public Service Award (1973), the Navy Distinguished Public Service Award (1983), the AIAA Aerospace Communications Award (1969), the NASA Medal for Exceptional Scientific Achievement (1965), the AFCEA Gold Medal for Engineering (1984), the AIAA von Karman Lectureship in Astronautics (1985), the AIAA Robert H. Goddard Astronautics Award (1991) and the (Japan) NEC C&C (communications and computers) Prize (1992).

In the professional and academic world, Rechtin was a member of Tau Beta Pi and Sigma Xi, and was honored as a Fellow of both the IRE and ARS in 1963. In 1968, he became a member of the National Academy of Engineering in 1968. He was honored as a distinguished alumnus by Caltech in 1984 and was a UCLA Engineering Citation Award recipient in 1986. In 2005, USC awarded him an honorary doctorate.

In 1977, Rechtin received the IEEE Alexander Graham Bell Medal "For pioneering and lasting contributions to deep-space-vehicle communications technology and for leadership in defense telecommunications."

== Publications ==
- 1991, Systems Architecting, Creating and Building Complex Systems, Prentice-Hall
- 1997, The Art of Systems Architecting, with Mark W. Maier, CRC Press LLC
- 1999, Systems Architecting of Organizations: Why Eagles Can't Swim, CRC Press LLC
- 2000, The Art of Systems Architecting, Second Edition, with Mark W. Maier, CRC Press LLC.

Government offices
Preceded by Charles M. Herzfeld	Director of ARPA; 1967–1970	Succeeded by Stephen J. Lukasik
Awards
Preceded by Amos E. Joel, Jr. William Keister; Raymond W. Ketchledge	IEEE Alexander Graham Bell Medal; 1977	Succeeded by M. Robert Aaron; John S. Mayo; Eric E. Sumner
