= Vint Cerf =

American computer scientist and Internet pioneer (born 1943)

Vint Cerf ForMemRS
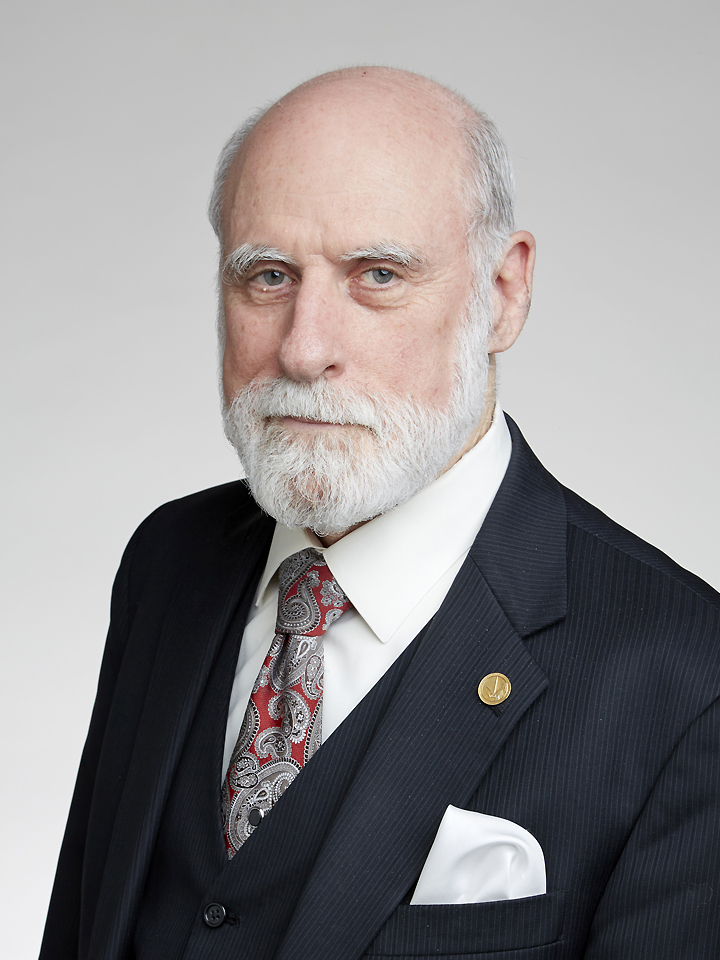
- Cerf in 2016
- Born: Vinton Gray Cerf; June 23, 1943 (age 83); New Haven, Connecticut, U.S.
- Education: Stanford University (BS); University of California, Los Angeles (MS, PhD)
- Known for: TCP/IP; Internet Society
- Awards: ACM Fellow (1994); IEEE Alexander Graham Bell Medal (1997); IEEE Medal of Honor (2023); National Medal of Technology (1997); Marconi Prize (1998); Prince of Asturias Award (2002); Turing Award (2004); Presidential Medal of Freedom (2005); Japan Prize (2008); Harold Pender Award (2010); Queen Elizabeth Prize for Engineering (2013); ForMemRS (2016)
- Scientific career
- Fields: Telecommunications
- Workplaces: IBM, International Institute of Information Technology, Hyderabad, UCLA, Stanford University, DARPA, MCI, CNRI, Google
- Thesis: Multiprocessors, Semaphores, and a Graph Model of Computation (1972)
- Doctoral advisor: Gerald Estrin

Signature
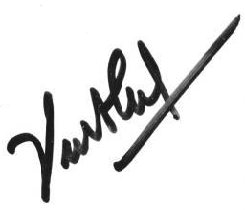

Vinton Gray Cerf (/sɜːrf/; born June 23, 1943) is an American Internet pioneer and is recognized as one of "the fathers of the Internet", sharing this title with TCP/IP co-developer Robert Kahn.

He has received honorary degrees and awards that include the National Medal of Technology, the Turing Award, the Presidential Medal of Freedom, the Marconi Prize, and membership in the National Academy of Engineering.

== Life and career ==
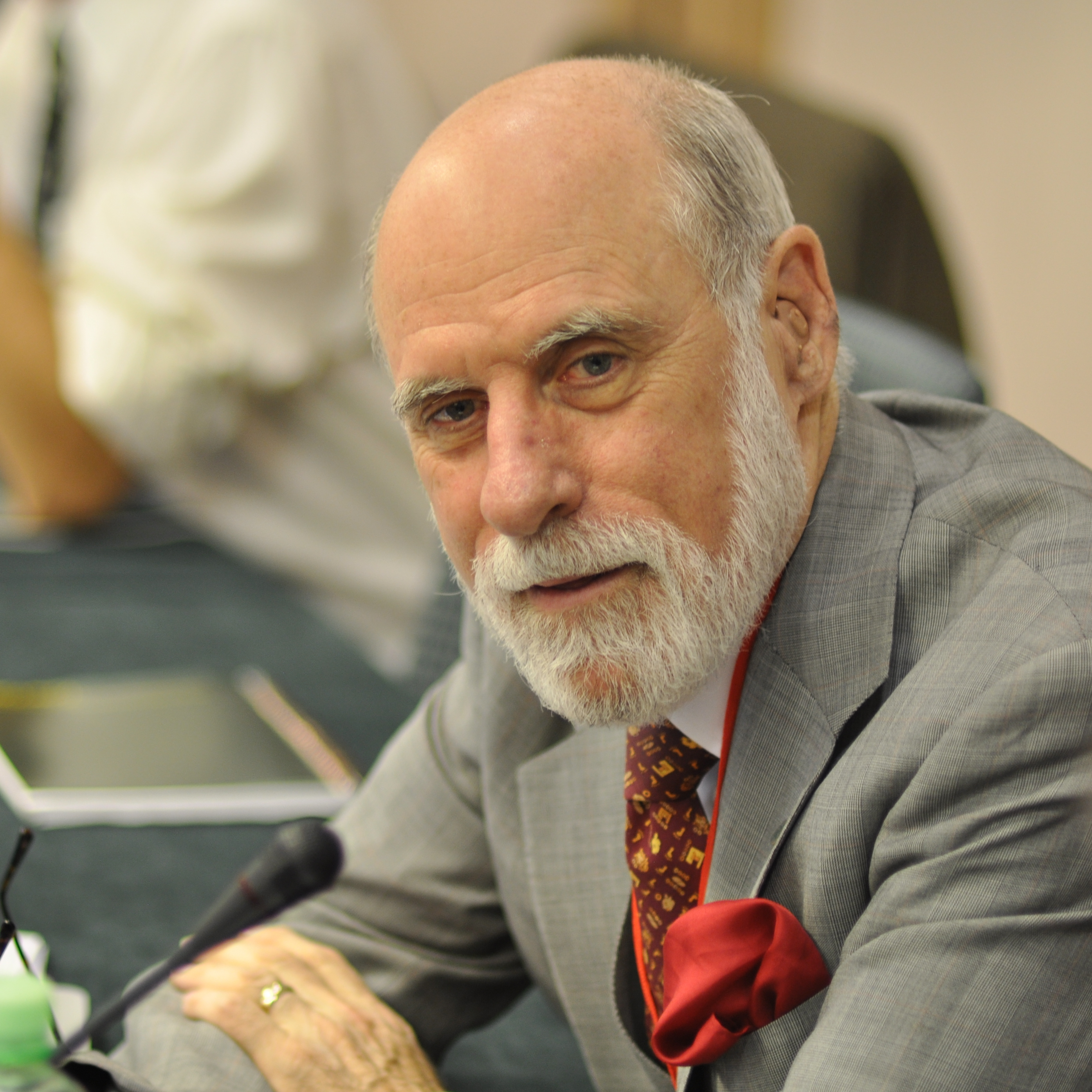
Vinton Cerf in Vilnius, September 2010

Vinton Gray Cerf was born in New Haven, Connecticut, on June 23, 1943, the son of Muriel (née Gray) and Vinton Thruston Cerf. His mother was born in Canada and was of British, Irish, and French Canadian descent. His paternal ancestors emigrated from Alsace–Lorraine to Kentucky. Cerf attended Van Nuys High School with Steve Crocker and Jon Postel. While in high school, Cerf worked at Rocketdyne on the Apollo program for six months and helped write statistical analysis software for the non-destructive tests of the F-1 engines.

Cerf received a Bachelor of Science degree in mathematics from Stanford University. After college, Cerf worked at IBM as a systems engineer supporting QUIKTRAN for two years.

Cerf and his wife Sigrid both have hearing deficiencies; they met at a hearing aid agent's practice in the 1960s, leading him to advocate for accessibility. They had two sons, David and Bennett.

He left IBM to attend graduate school at the University of California, Los Angeles, where he earned his M.S. degree in 1970 and his PhD in 1972. Cerf studied under Professor Gerald Estrin and worked in Professor Leonard Kleinrock's data packet networking group that connected the first two nodes of the ARPANET, the first node on the Internet, and "contributed to a host-to-host protocol" for the ARPANET.

While at UCLA, Cerf met Bob Kahn, who was working on the ARPANET system architecture. Cerf chaired the International Network Working Group. He wrote the first TCP with Yogen Dalal and Carl Sunshine, called Specification of Internet Transmission Control Program (RFC 675), published in December 1974.

Cerf worked as assistant professor at Stanford University from 1972 to 1976 where he conducted research on packet network interconnection protocols and co-designed the DoD TCP/IP protocol suite with Kahn.

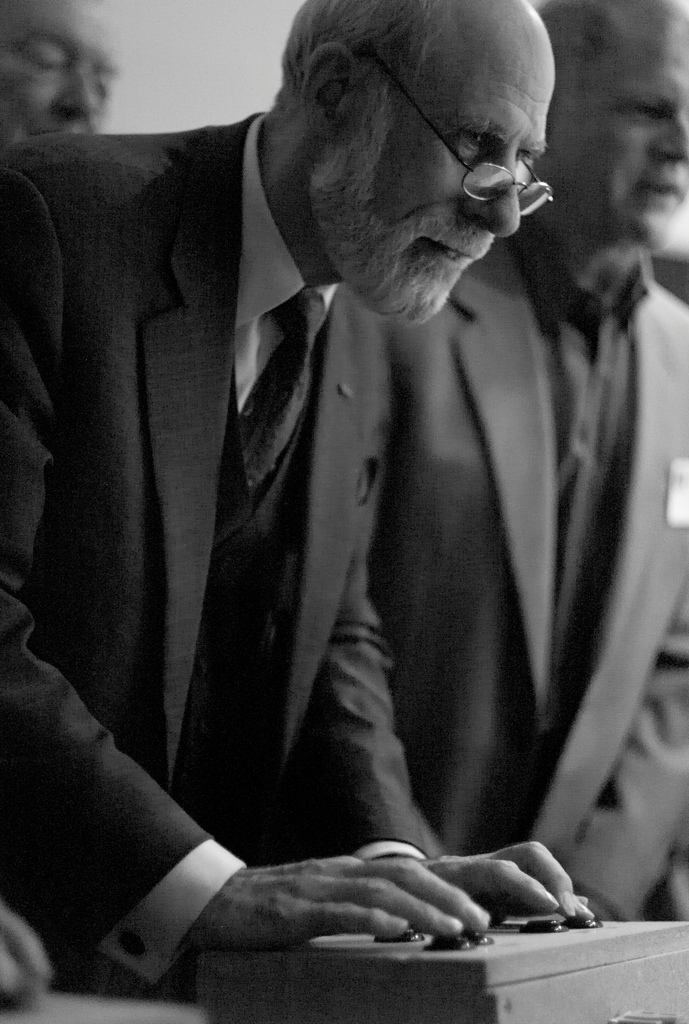
Cerf playing Spacewar! on the Computer History Museum's PDP-1, ICANN meeting, 2007

From 1973 to 1982, Cerf worked at the United States Defense Advanced Research Projects Agency (DARPA) and funded various groups to develop TCP/IP, packet radio (PRNET), packet satellite (SATNET) and packet security technology. These efforts were rooted in the needs of the military. In the late 1980s, Cerf moved to MCI where he helped develop the first commercial email system (MCI Mail) to be connected to the Internet, in 1989.

Cerf is active in a number of global humanitarian organizations. Cerf typically appears in a three-piece suit, a rarity in an industry known for its casual dress norms.

As vice president of MCI Digital Information Services from 1982 to 1986, Cerf led the engineering of MCI Mail, which became the first commercial email service to be connected to the Internet in 1989. In 1986, he joined Bob Kahn at the Corporation for National Research Initiatives as its vice president, working with Kahn on Digital Libraries, Knowledge Robots, and gigabit speed networks. Since 1988 Cerf lobbied for the privatization of the internet. In 1992, he and Kahn, among others, founded the Internet Society (ISOC) to provide leadership in education, policy and standards related to the Internet. Cerf served as the first president of ISOC. Cerf rejoined MCI in 1994 and served as Senior Vice President of Technology Strategy. In this role, he helped to guide corporate strategy development from a technical perspective. Previously, he served as MCI's senior vice president of Architecture and Technology, leading a team of architects and engineers to design advanced networking frameworks, including Internet-based solutions for delivering a combination of data, information, voice and video services for business and consumer use.

During 1997, Cerf joined the board of trustees of Gallaudet University, a university for the education of the deaf and hard-of-hearing. Cerf himself is hard of hearing. He has also served on the university's Board of Associates.

Cerf, as leader of MCI's internet business, was criticized due to MCI's role in providing the IP addresses used by Send-Safe.com, a vendor of spamware that uses a botnet in order to send spam. MCI refused to terminate the spamware vendor. At the time, Spamhaus also listed MCI as the ISP with the most Spamhaus Block List listings.

Cerf worked for Google as a vice president and Chief Internet Evangelist from October 2005 to July 2026. In this function he has become well known for his predictions on how technology will affect future society, encompassing such areas as artificial intelligence, environmentalism, the advent of IPv6 and the transformation of the television industry and its delivery model.

Cerf has served as a commissioner for the Broadband Commission for Digital Development, a UN body which aims to make broadband internet technologies more widely available

Cerf helped fund and establish ICANN, the Internet Corporation for Assigned Names and Numbers. He joined the board in 1999 and served until November 2007. He was chairman from November 2000 to his departure from the board.

Cerf was a member of Bulgarian President Georgi Parvanov's IT Advisory Council (from March 2002 to January 2012). He is also a member of the advisory board of Eurasia Group, the political risk consultancy.

Cerf is also working on the Interplanetary Internet, together with NASA's Jet Propulsion Laboratory and other NASA laboratories. It will be a new standard to communicate from planet to planet, using radio/laser communications that are tolerant of signal degradations including variable delay and disruption caused, for example, by celestial motion.

On February 7, 2006, Cerf testified before the U.S. Senate Committee on Commerce, Science, and Transportation's hearing on net neutrality. Speaking as Google's Chief Internet Evangelist, Cerf noted that nearly half of all US consumers lacked meaningful choice in broadband providers and expressed concerns that without network neutrality government regulation, broadband providers would be able to use their dominance to limit options for consumers and charge companies like Google for their use of bandwidth.

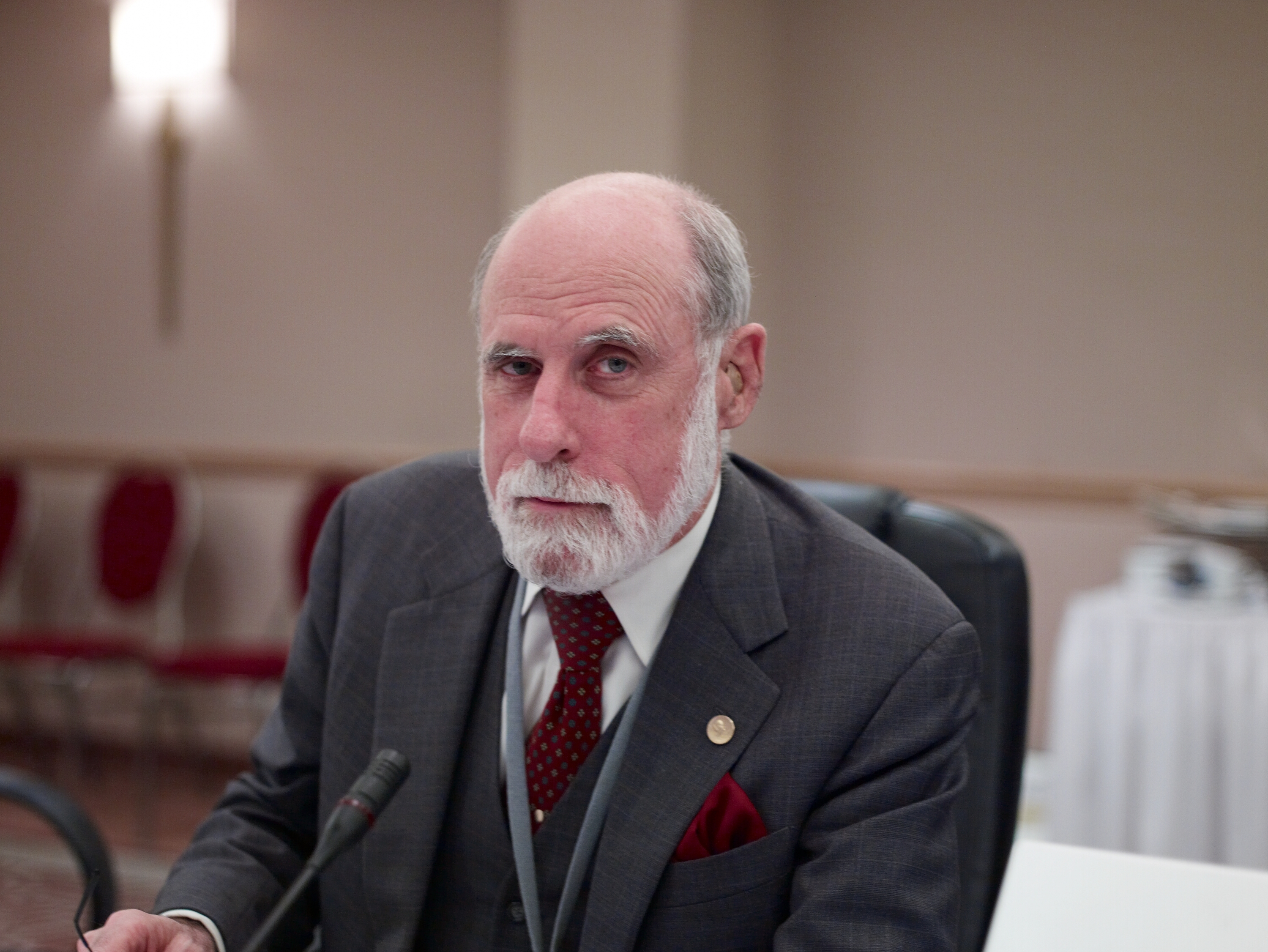
Cerf at 2007 Los Angeles ICANN meeting

Cerf currently serves on the board of advisors of Scientists and Engineers for America, an organization focused on promoting sound science in American government. He also serves on the advisory council of CRDF Global (Civilian Research and Development Foundation) and was on the International Multilateral Partnership Against Cyber Threats (IMPACT) International Advisory Board.

Cerf was elected as the president of the Association for Computing Machinery in May 2012 and joined the Council on CyberSecurity's Board of Advisors in August 2013.

From 2011 to 2016, Cerf was chairman of the board of trustees of ARIN, the Regional Internet Registry (RIR) of IP addresses for the United States, Canada, and part of the Caribbean. Until Fall 2015, Cerf chaired the board of directors of StopBadware, a non-profit anti-malware organization that started as a project at Harvard University's Berkman Center for Internet & Society. Cerf is on the board of advisors to The Liquid Information Company Ltd of the UK, which works to make the web more usefully interactive and which has produced the Mac OS X utility called 'Liquid'. Vint Cerf is a member of the CuriosityStream Advisory Board.

During 2008, Cerf chaired the Internationalized domain name (IDNAbis) working group of the IETF. In 2008 Cerf was a major contender to be designated the first U.S. Chief Technology Officer by President Barack Obama. Cerf is the co-chair of Campus Party Silicon Valley, the US edition of one of the largest technology festivals in the world, along with Al Gore and Tim Berners-Lee.

From 2009 to 2011, Cerf was an elected member of the governing board of the Smart Grid Interoperability Panel (SGIP). SGIP is a public-private consortium established by NIST in 2009 and provides a forum for businesses and other stakeholder groups to participate in coordinating and accelerating development of standards for the evolving Smart Grid.

Cerf was elected to a two-year term as president of the Association for Computing Machinery (ACM) beginning July 1, 2012. On January 16, 2013, U.S. President Barack Obama announced his intent to appoint Cerf to the National Science Board. Cerf served until May 2018 when his six-year term expired. In 2015 Cerf co-founded (with Mei Lin Fung) and until December 2019 chaired the People-Centered Internet (PCI).

Cerf is also among the 15 members of governing council of International Institute of Information Technology, Hyderabad.

In June 2016, his work with NASA led to delay-tolerant networking being installed on the International Space Station with an aim towards an Interplanetary Internet.

Since at least 2015, Cerf has been raising concerns about the wide-ranging risks of digital obsolescence, the potential of losing much historic information about our time – a digital "Dark Age" or "black hole" – given the ubiquitous digital storage of text, data, images, music and more. Among the concerns are the long-term storage of, and continued reliable access to, our vast stores of present-day digital data and the associated programs, operating systems, computers and peripherals required to access such.

Cerf has been a member of the Board of Governors of the Folger Shakespeare Library since 2015.

== Awards and honors ==
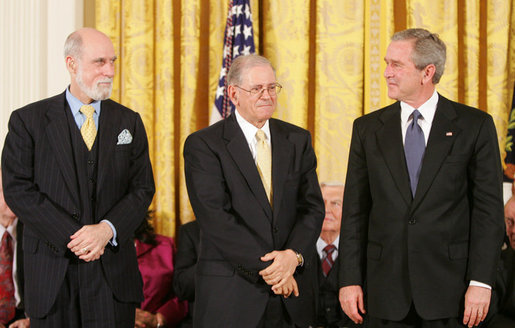
Cerf and Robert Kahn being awarded the Presidential Medal of Freedom by President George W. Bush in 2005

Cerf and Bulgarian President Georgi Parvanov being awarded the St. Cyril and Methodius in the Coat of Arms Order, 2006

Cerf has received a number of honorary degrees, including doctorates, from the University of the Balearic Islands, ETHZ in Zurich, Switzerland, Capitol College, Gettysburg College, Yale University, George Mason University, Marymount University, Bethany College (Kansas), University of Pisa, University of Rovira and Virgili (Tarragona, Spain), Rensselaer Polytechnic Institute, Luleå University of Technology (Sweden), University of Twente (Netherlands), Beijing University of Posts and Telecommunications, Tsinghua University (Beijing), Brooklyn Polytechnic, UPCT (University of Cartagena, Spain), Zaragoza University (Spain), University of Reading (United Kingdom), Royal Roads University (Canada), MGIMO (Moscow State University of International Relations), Buenos Aires Institute of Technology (Argentina), Polytechnic University of Madrid, Keio University (Japan), University of South Australia (Australia), University of St Andrews (Scotland), University of Pittsburgh and Gallaudet University (United States). Other awards include:

- Edward A. Dickson Alumnus of the Year Award from UCLA
- Prince of Asturias award for science and technology
- Life Member IEEE
- Fellow of the IEEE for contribution and leadership in the design, development, and application of internet protocols.
- Fellow of the Association for Computing Machinery, 1994
- Elected as a member into the National Academy of Engineering in 1995 for contributions to the design and development of network protocols and leadership in the evolution of the Internet.
- Yuri Rubinsky Memorial Award, 1996
- SIGCOMM Award for "contributions to the Internet [spanning] more than 25 years, from development of the fundamental TCP/IP protocols".
- Certificate of Merit from The Franklin Institute, in 1996.
- In December 1997 he, along with his partner Robert E. Kahn, was presented with the National Medal of Technology by President Bill Clinton, "for creating and sustaining development of Internet Protocols and continuing to provide leadership in the emerging industry of internetworking."
- Stibitz-Wilson Award from the American Computer & Robotics Museum in 1999.
- In 2000, he received the honorary doctorate degree from URV, Spain.
- He received the Living Legend Medal from the Library of Congress in April 2000.
- In 2000, he was made a Fellow of the Computer History Museum "for his contributions to computer architecture, operating systems, and software engineering."
- Cerf was selected as a Fellow of the Association for Women in Science (AWIS) in 2000.
- Cerf was awarded the Award of Technology from the Telluride Tech Festival in 2002, also known as the Tesla Festival since the world's first AC hydro-power power plant was built in Telluride in 1891 by L.L. Nunn who purchased the generator and plans from George Westinghouse and Tesla.
- Cerf and Kahn were the winners of the Turing Award for 2004, for their "pioneering work on internetworking, including .. the Internet's basic communications protocols .. and for inspired leadership in networking."
- In November 2005, Vinton Cerf and Kahn were awarded the Presidential Medal of Freedom by President George W. Bush for their contributions to the creation of the Internet.
- He and Robert Kahn were inducted into the National Inventors Hall of Fame in May 2006.
- Vinton Cerf was awarded the St. Cyril and Methodius in the Coat of Arms Order in July 2006
- Vinton Cerf and Robert Kahn were each inducted as an Honorary Fellow of the Society for Technical Communication (STC) in May 2006
- He and Robert Kahn were awarded the Japan Prize in January 2008.
- Cerf was inducted into the Worshipful Company of Information Technologists and given the Freedom of the City of London in April 2008.
- Cerf was awarded an honorary membership in the Yale Political Union after keynoting a lively debate on the subject "Resolved: Online Communities are Real Communities." The motion passed.
- In celebration of the five year-anniversary of YouTube he was selected as a guest curator by the site, and chose the six videos on YouTube he found most memorable.
- IEEE-HKN Eta Kappa Nu Eminent Member, 2010
- In May 2011, he was awarded an HPI Fellowship as "...a tribute to his work for a new medium which influenced the everyday life of our society like no other one."
- In September 2011 he was made a distinguished fellow of British Computer Society, in recognition of his outstanding contribution and service to the advancement of computing.
- In 2012 he was inducted as a Pioneer into the Internet Hall of Fame
- In 2013, Cerf was one of five Internet and Web pioneers awarded the inaugural Queen Elizabeth Prize for Engineering.
- In 2013, Cerf presented the Bernard Price Memorial Lecture
- In 2014, Cerf was awarded the Order of the Cross of Terra Mariana, 1st class for his role in invention of TCP/IP by president of Estonia Toomas Hendrik Ilves
- In 2014, Cerf was awarded Officer of the French Légion d'honneur
- In 2015, Cerf received an honorary doctorate from the University of Reading, UK.
- Cerf was elected a Foreign Member of The UK Royal Society in 2016
- In 2018, Cerf was named a recipient of the Benjamin Franklin Medal
- In 2018, Cerf was awarded Catalonia's International Award
- In 2023, Cerf was awarded the IEEE Medal of Honor for co-creating the Internet architecture and providing sustained leadership in its phenomenal growth in becoming society's critical infrastructure
- In 2024, Cerf was inducted into the California Hall of Fame.
- In 2026, Cerf received the Golden Plate Award of the American Academy of Achievement.

== Partial bibliography ==
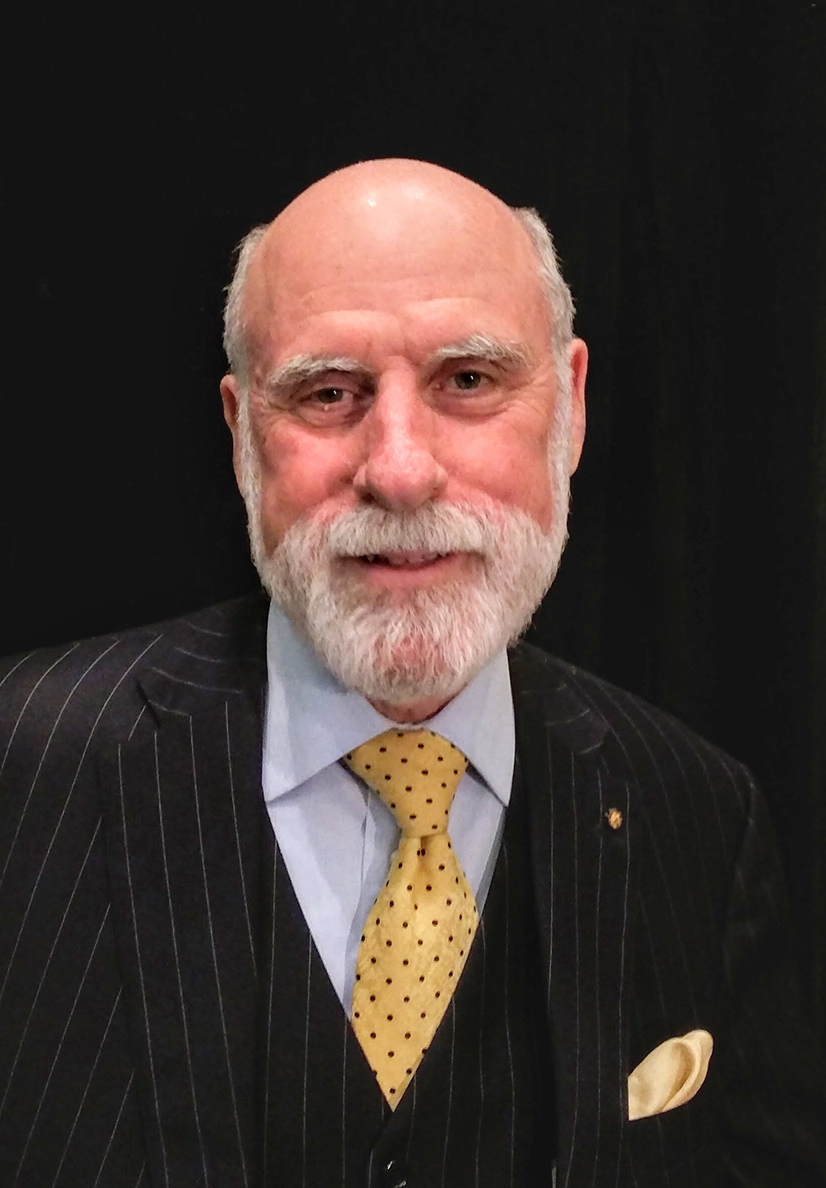
Vint Cerf, before his talk in memory of Dr. John Niparko at the 2017 MidWinter Meeting of the Association for Research in Otolaryngology in Baltimore

=== Author ===
- Zero Text Length EOF Message (RFC 13, August 1969)
- IMP-IMP and HOST-HOST Control Links (RFC 18, September 1969)
- ASCII format for network interchange (RFC 20, October 1969)
- Host-host control message formats (RFC 22, October 1969)
- Data transfer protocols (RFC 163, May 1971)
- PARRY encounters the DOCTOR (RFC 439, January 1973)
- 'Twas the night before start-up (RFC 968, December 1985)
- Report of the second Ad Hoc Network Management Review Group, RFC 1109, August 1989
- Internet Activities Board, RFC 1120, September 1989
- Thoughts on the National Research and Education Network, RFC 1167, July 1990
- Networks, Scientific American Special Issue on Communications, Computers, and Networks, September 1991
- Guidelines for Internet Measurement Activities, October 1991
- A VIEW FROM THE 21ST CENTURY, RFC 1607, April 1, 1994
- An Agreement between the Internet Society and Sun Microsystems, Inc. in the Matter of ONC RPC and XDR Protocols, RFC 1790, April 1995
- I REMEMBER IANA, RFC 2468, October 17, 1998
- Memo from the Consortium for Slow Commotion Research (CSCR, RFC 1217, April 1, 1999
- The Internet is for Everyone, RFC 3271, April 2002

=== Co-author ===
- Vinton Cerf, Robert Kahn, A Protocol for Packet Network Intercommunication (IEEE Transactions on Communications, May 1974)
- Vinton Cerf, Yogen Dalal, Carl Sunshine, Specification of Internet Transmission Control Program (RFC 675, December 1974)
- Vinton Cerf, Jon Postel, Mail transition plan (RFC 771, September 1980)
- Vinton Cerf, K.L. Mills Explaining the role of GOSIP, RFC 1169, August 1990
- Clark, Chapin, Cerf, Braden, Hobby, Towards the Future Internet Architecture, RFC 1287, December 1991
- Vinton Cerf et al., A Strategic Plan for Deploying an Internet X.500 Directory Service, RFC 1430, February 1993
- Vinton Cerf & Bob Kahn, Al Gore and the Internet, 2000-09-28
- Vinton Cerf et al., Internet Radio Communication System July 9, 2002, U.S. Patent 6,418,138
- Vinton Cerf et al., System for Distributed Task Execution June 3, 2003, U.S. Patent 6,574,628
- Vinton Cerf et al., Delay-Tolerant Networking Architecture (Informational Status), RFC 4838, April 2007

Cerf writes under the column name "CERF'S UP", and Cerf's car has a vanity plate (registration) "CERFSUP".

== See also ==
- History of the Internet
- List of Internet pioneers
- List of pioneers in computer science
- Paul Baran and Donald Davies, independently invented packet-switched networks
- Protocol Wars

Awards and achievements
Preceded by Tadahiro Sekimoto	IEEE Alexander Graham Bell Medal; 1997 with Bob Kahn	Succeeded by Richard Blahut
