= Cutler feed =

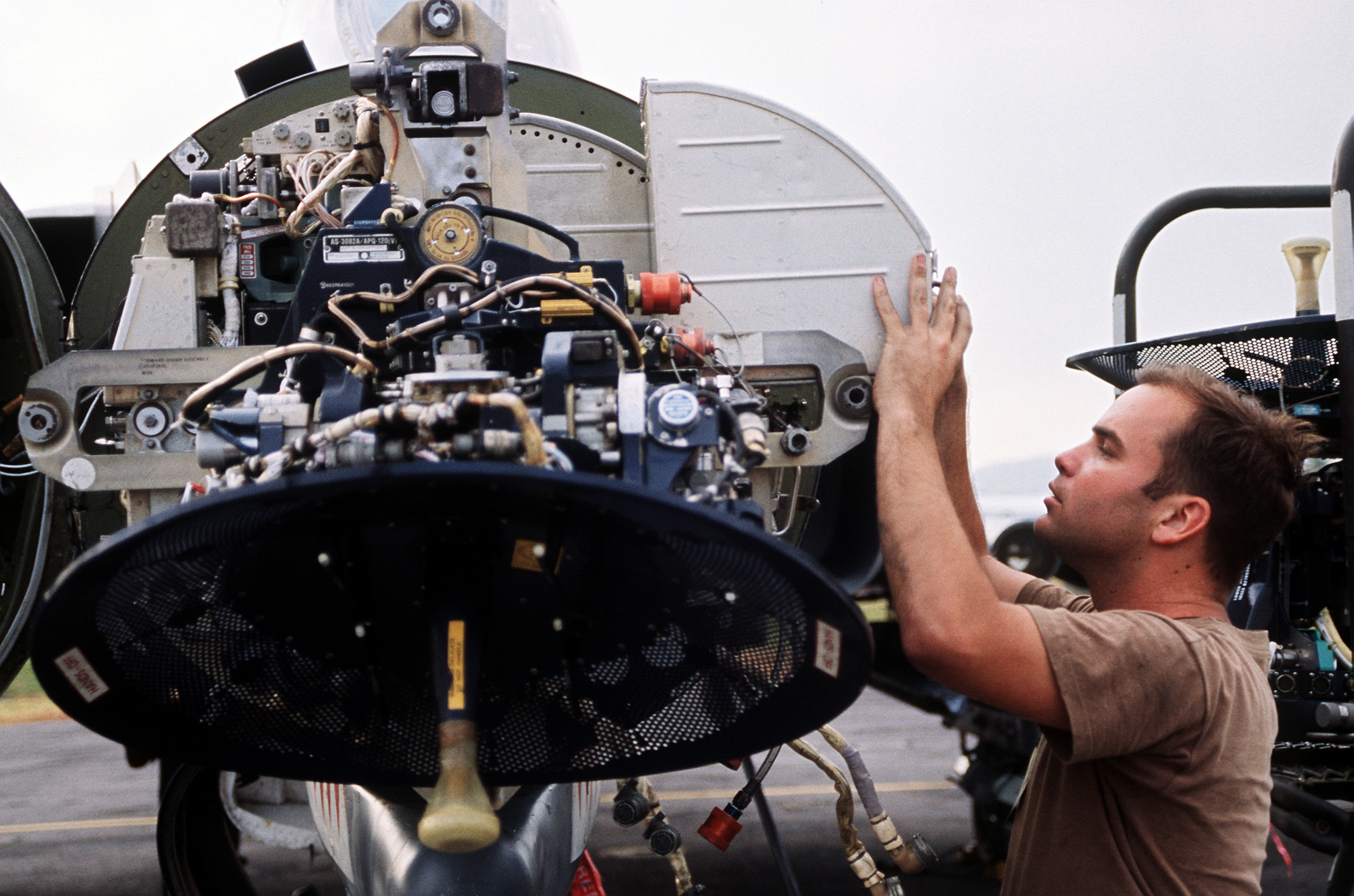
The F-4E's AN/APQ-120 radar used a Culter feed to perform conical scanning. It is enclosed in a translucent plexiglass form for added mechanical strength.

A Cutler feed is a type of antenna used in radars operating in microwave frequencies. It consists of a coin-shaped resonant cavity that is placed at the end of a waveguide. Slots, typically two, are cut into the side of the chamber facing the parabolic reflector. It is tuned to resonance using a small screw.

The system is almost always found in conical scanning systems. It has the advantage of being very robust mechanically, with the disk being not much larger than the waveguide and the waveguide itself acting as the primary support. To perform conical scanning, either the disk or the entire feed can be rotated.

It is named for its inventor, C. Chapin Cutler of Bell Labs. Cutler feeds were popular in radars from the 1950s and especially 1960s, before the widespread introduction of flat-plate phased array antennas.
