= Peter Sienpin Chow =

American electrical engineer

Academic background
- Education: Stanford University
- Thesis: Bandwidth optimized digital transmission techniques for spectrally shaped channels with impulse noise (1993)
- Doctoral advisor: John Cioffi

Peter Sienpin Chow is an American electrical engineer. A Ph.D. student of John Cioffi at Stanford University, he is best known for his contributions to the development of discrete multi-tone modulation and its application to digital subscriber line services.

Chow is the son of Kai An and Hsin Sheng Chow of Elmhurst, New York. He attended Midland High School in Michigan, and then did his undergraduate studies at Princeton University and his Ph.D. at Stanford University. One result from his dissertation was proof that an on-off energy distribution has negligible loss compared to an exact water-filling shape, "as long as it uses the same or nearly the same transmission band as water-filling".

After completing his Ph.D., Chow joined Amati, a company founded in 1992 by Cioffi, who had taken a two-year leave of absence from Stanford to commercialize discrete multi-tone modulation. In 2010, Chow joined Assia, a Los Altos-based broadband technology vendor also founded by Cioffi in 2003. He was named a Fellow of the Institute of Electrical and Electronics Engineers (IEEE) in 2013 for his contributions to digital subscriber line technology.

Chow married Carla Marie Holmes of Menlo Park, California, in a ceremony at the Thomas Fogarty Winery in 1999.
