= Christian Jacobæus =

Swedish electrical engineer (1911–1988)

- Born: 1911; Stockholm, Sweden
- Died: 1988 (aged 76–77)
- Education: Royal Institute of Technology
- Known for: contributions to teletraffic engineering
- Awards: IEEE Alexander Graham Bell Medal
- Engineering career
- Discipline: electrical engineering
- Significant design: the modern crossbar switch used for telephone switching

Anton Christian Jacobæus (1911 in Stockholm, Sweden – 1988) was a Swedish electrical engineer, known for his contributions to teletraffic engineering, especially in the design of the modern crossbar switch used for telephone switching.

Jacobæus graduated from the Royal Institute of Technology (KTH) in 1933 with a master's degree in electrical engineering. In 1935 he went to work for L. M. Ericsson, where he would spend his entire professional career. In 1950 he received his doctorate in electrical engineering, also from KTH. His dissertation titled A study of congestion in link systems became instrumental in the efficient design of crossbar switches. He became technical director in 1950, then senior vice president from 1963 until his retirement in 1976. He then continued to serve as a consultant to the company's management.

He was a member of the Royal Swedish Academy of Engineering Sciences 1957–88, serving as its vice chairman 1979–81, and a member of the Royal Swedish Academy of Sciences from 1974. He was a fellow of IEEE from 1977.

In 1979, he was awarded the IEEE Alexander Graham Bell Medal.

Christian Jacobæus was the son of Hans Christian Jacobæus.

Awards
Preceded by M. Robert Aaron, John S. Mayo and Eric E. Sumner	IEEE Alexander Graham Bell Medal; 1979	Succeeded by Richard R. Hough
