= Inkyu Lee =

Electrical engineer

Inkyu Lee from the Korea University, Seoul, Korea was named Fellow of the Institute of Electrical and Electronics Engineers (IEEE) in 2016 for contributions to multiple antenna systems for wireless communications.
