= Rockefeller Differential Analyzer =

Designed by Vannevar Bush after he became director of the Carnegie Institution for Science in Washington DC, the Rockefeller Differential Analyzer (RDA) was an electro-mechanical version of the differential analyzer, which Bush had built at the Massachusetts Institute of Technology between 1928 and 1931.

The RDA became operational in 1942. It contained 18 integrators split into three sections. Each section could work on a different problem, or they could be combined to handle larger problems.

A system of gears allowed constants to be specified with up to four decimal places. The projected precision was 1 part in 10,000, and solutions accurate to 1 part in 25,000 were obtained for stable problems.

The machine contained 2,000 vacuum tubes, used 200 miles of wire, 150 motors, several thousand relays, and weighed 100 tons.

It was the most important computer in the US at the end of the war with Germany, when the Harvard Mark I was not completed.
