= Paul Baran =

American-Jewish engineer (1926–2011)

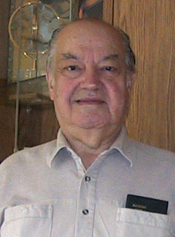
- Baran in 2003
- Born: Pesach Baran; April 29, 1926; Grodno, Poland (now Belarus)
- Died: March 26, 2011 (aged 84); Palo Alto, California, U.S.
- Citizenship: Poland, United States
- Education: Drexel University (BS); University of California, Los Angeles (MS)
- Known for: Packet switching
- Spouse: Evelyn Murphy Baran (m. 1955)
- Awards: IEEE Alexander Graham Bell Medal (1990); Computer History Museum Fellow (2005); Marconi Prize (1991); National Medal of Technology and Innovation (2007); National Inventors Hall of Fame
- Scientific career
- Workplaces: RAND Corporation

Paul Baran (born Pesach Baran /ˈbærən/; April 29, 1926 – March 26, 2011) was a Polish-American engineer who was a pioneer in the development of computer networks. He was one of the two independent inventors of packet switching, which is today the dominant basis for data communications in computer networks worldwide, and went on to start several companies and develop other technologies that are an essential part of modern digital communication.

== Early life ==
He was born in Grodno (then in the Second Polish Republic, and since 1945 part of Belarus) on April 29, 1926. He was the youngest of three children in his Lithuanian Jewish family, with the Yiddish given name "Pesach". His family moved to the United States on May 11, 1928, settling in Boston and later in Philadelphia, where his father, Morris "Moshe" Baran (1884–1979), opened a grocery store. He graduated from Drexel University (then called Drexel Institute of Technology) in 1949, with a degree in electrical engineering. He then joined the Eckert-Mauchly Computer Company, where he did technical work on UNIVAC models, the first brand of commercial computers in the United States. In 1955 he married Evelyn Murphy, moved to Los Angeles, and worked for Hughes Aircraft on radar data processing systems. He obtained his master's degree in engineering from UCLA in 1959, with advisor Gerald Estrin while he took night classes. His thesis was on character recognition. While Baran initially stayed on at UCLA to pursue his doctorate, a heavy travel and work schedule forced him to abandon his doctoral work.

== Packet switched network design ==
The "block message" as suggested by Paul Baran in 1964; his initial proposal in 1962 was the first use of the concept of a data packet.

After joining the RAND Corporation in 1959, Baran took on the task of designing a "survivable" communications system that could maintain communication between end points in the face of damage from nuclear weapons during the Cold War. Then, most American military communications used high-frequency connections, which could be put out of action for many hours by a nuclear attack. Baran decided to automate RAND Director Franklin R. Collbohm's previous work with emergency communication over conventional AM radio networks and showed that a distributed relay node architecture could be survivable. The Rome Air Development Center soon showed that the idea was practicable.

Using the minicomputer technology of the day, Baran and his team developed a simulation suite to test basic connectivity of an array of nodes with varying degrees of linking. That is, a network of n-ary degree of connectivity would have n links per node. The simulation randomly "killed" nodes and subsequently tested the percentage of nodes that remained connected. The result of the simulation revealed that networks in which n ≥ 3 had a significant increase in resilience against even as much as 50% node loss. Baran's insight gained from the simulation was that redundancy was the key. His first work was published as a RAND report in 1960, with more papers generalizing the techniques in the next two years.

After proving survivability, Baran and his team needed to show proof of concept for that design so that it could be built. That involved high-level schematics detailing the operation, construction, and cost of all the components required to construct a network that leveraged the new insight of redundant links. The result was one of the first store-and-forward data layer switching protocols, a link-state/distance vector routing protocol, and an unproved connection-oriented transport protocol. Explicit detail of the designs can be found in the complete series of reports On Distributed Communications, published by RAND in 1964.

The design flew in the face of telephony design of the time by placing inexpensive and unreliable nodes at the center of the network and more intelligent terminating 'multiplexer' devices at the endpoints. In Baran's words, unlike the telephone company's equipment, his design did not require expensive "gold plated" components to be reliable. The Distributed Network that Baran introduced was intended to route around damage. It provided connection to others through many points, not one centralized connection. Fundamental to the scheme was the division of the information into "blocks" before they were sent out across the network. That enabled the data to travel faster and communications lines to be used more efficiently. Each block was sent separately, traveling different paths and rejoining into a whole when they were received at their destination.

=== Selling the idea ===
After the publication of On Distributed Communications, he presented the findings of his team to a number of audiences, including AT&T engineers (not to be confused with Bell Labs engineers, who at the time provided Paul Baran with the specifications for the first generation of T1 circuit that he used as the links in his network design proposal). In subsequent interviews, Baran mentioned how the AT&T engineers scoffed at his idea of non-dedicated physical circuits for voice communications, at times claiming that Baran simply did not understand how voice telecommunication worked.

Donald Davies, at the National Physical Laboratory in the United Kingdom, also thought of the same idea and implemented a trial network. While Baran used the term "message blocks" for his units of communication, Davies used the term "packets," as it was capable of being translated into languages other than English without compromise. He applied the concept to a general-purpose computer network. Davies's key insight came in the realization that computer network traffic was inherently "bursty" with periods of silence, compared with relatively-constant telephone traffic. It was in fact Davies's work on packet switching, not Baran's, that initially caught the attention of the developers of ARPANET at the Symposium on Operating Systems Principles in October 1967. Baran was happy to acknowledge that Davies had come up with the same idea as him independently. In an e-mail to Davies, he wrote:

You and I share a common view of what packet switching is all about, since you and I independently came up with the same ingredients.

Leonard Kleinrock, a contemporary working on analyzing message flow using queueing theory, developed a theoretical basis for the operation of message switching networks in his proposal for a Ph.D. thesis in 1961-2, published as a book in 1964. In the early 1970s, he applied this theory to model the performance of packet switching networks. However, the representation of Kleinrock's early work as originating the concept of packet switching is disputed by other internet pioneers, including Robert Taylor, Baran and Davies. Baran and Davies are recognized by historians and the U.S. National Inventors Hall of Fame for independently inventing the concept of digital packet switching used in modern computer networking including the Internet.

In 1969, when the US Advanced Research Projects Agency (ARPA) started implementing the idea of an internetworked set of terminals to share computing resources, the reference materials that they considered included Baran and the RAND Corporation's "On Distributed Communications" volumes. The resiliency of a packet-switched network that uses link-state routing protocols, which are used on the Internet, stems in part from the research to develop a network that could survive a nuclear attack.

== Later work ==
In 1968, Baran was a founder of the Institute for the Future and was then involved in other networking technologies developed in Silicon Valley. He wrote on the subject of computer systems and privacy. Baran participated in a review of the NBS proposal for a Data Encryption Standard in 1976, along with Martin Hellman and Whitfield Diffie of Stanford University.

In 1971, he predicted the development of household email. He estimated potential revenue for such services to be $707 million by 1989.

In the early 1980s, Baran founded PacketCable, Inc, "to support impulse-pay television channels, locally generated videotex, and packetized voice transmission." PacketCable, also known as Packet Technologies, spun off StrataCom to commercialize his packet voice technology for the telephony market. That technology led to the first commercial pre-standard Asynchronous Transfer Mode product.

He founded Telebit after conceiving its discrete multitone modem technology in the mid-1980s. It was one of the first commercial products to use orthogonal frequency-division multiplexing, which was later widely deployed in DSL modems and Wi-Fi wireless modems.

In 1985, Baran founded Metricom, the first wireless Internet company, which deployed Ricochet, the first public wireless mesh networking system. In 1992, he also founded Com21, an early cable modem company. After Com21, Baran founded and was president of GoBackTV, which specializes in personal TV and cable IPTV infrastructure equipment for television operators. Later, he founded Plaster Networks, providing an advanced solution for connecting networked devices in the home or small office through existing wiring.

Baran extended his work in packet switching to wireless-spectrum theory, developing what he called "kindergarten rules" for the use of wireless spectrum.

In addition to his innovation in networking products, he is also credited with inventing the first doorway gun detector.

He received an honorary doctorate when he gave the commencement speech at Drexel in 1997.

== Death ==
Baran died in Palo Alto, California, at the age of 84 on March 26, 2011 from complications caused by lung cancer. Upon his death, RAND President James Thomson, stated, "Our world is a better place for the technologies Paul Baran invented and developed, and also because of his consistent concern with appropriate public policies for their use."

One of the fathers of the Internet, Vinton Cerf, stated, "Paul wasn't afraid to go in directions counter to what everyone else thought was the right or only thing to do." According to Paul Saffo, Baran also believed that innovation was a "team process" and avoided seeking credit for himself. On hearing news of his death, Robert Kahn, co-inventor of the Internet, said: "Paul was one of the finest gentlemen I ever met and creative to the very end."

== Awards and honors ==
- IEEE Alexander Graham Bell Medal (1990)
- Marconi Prize (1991)
- Nippon Electronics Corporation C&C Prize (1996)
- Bower Award and Prize for Achievement in Science (2001)
- Fellow of the American Academy of Arts and Sciences (2003)
- Fellow of the Computer History Museum (2005) "for fundamental contributions to the architecture of the Internet and for a lifetime of entrepreneurial activity."
- National Inventors Hall of Fame (2007)
- National Medal of Technology and Innovation (2007)
- UCLA Engineering Alumnus of the Year (2009)
- Internet Hall of Fame (2012)

== See also ==
- Internet pioneers
- List of pioneers in computer science

Awards
Preceded by Gerald R. Ash and Billy B. Oliver	IEEE Alexander Graham Bell Medal; 1990	Succeeded by C. Chapin Cutler, John O. Limb and Arun Netravali
