= Marconi Prize =

The Marconi Prize
- Awarded for: Exceptional contributions to the field of information and communication technology for the benefit of mankind.
- Presented by: Marconi Society
- First award: 1975
- Website: https://www.marconisociety.org/

The Marconi Prize is an annual award that the Marconi Society gives for outstanding achievements and advancements in communications (radio, mobile, wireless, telecommunications, data communications, networks, the Internet, etc.). Prizewinners receive in-person recognition from distinguished colleagues and other guests as well as a work of sculpture at the Marconi Society's annual symposium and gala.

== Criteria ==
The Marconi Prize is awarded based on the candidate’s contributions in the following areas:

- The significance of the impact of the nominee’s work on widely-used technology.
- The scientific importance of the nominee’s work in setting the stage for, influencing, and advancing the field beyond the nominee’s own achievements.
- The nominee’s contributions to innovation and entrepreneurship by introducing completely new ideas, methods, or technologies. These may include forming, leading, or advising organizations, mentoring students on moving ideas from research to implementation, or fostering new industries/enabling scale implementation.
- The social and humanitarian impact of the nominee’s contributions to the design, development, and/or deployment of new communication technologies or communications public policies that promote social development and/or inclusiveness.

== Marconi Fellowships ==
Marconi Prize recipients are also named Marconi Fellows. The foundation and the prize are named in honor of Guglielmo Marconi, a Nobel laureate and one of the pioneers of radio communications. Fellows are expected to pursue further creative work to advance the understanding and development of communications technologies for the benefit of mankind.

== List of Marconi Prize winners ==
First given in 1975, the prize has gone to such notable figures as Lawrence E. Page and Sergey Brin for inventing search engine Google, Tim Berners-Lee for his leadership and innovations in establishing the World Wide Web, Nobel Laureate Charles K. Kao for developing fiber-optic communications, and Martin Hellman and Whitfield Diffie for creating the Diffie–Hellman key exchange.

- 1975: James Rhyne Killian
- 1976: Hiroshi Inose
- 1977: Arthur Leonard Schawlow
- 1978: Colin Cherry
- 1979: John Robinson Pierce
- 1980: Yash Pal
- 1981: Seymour Papert
- 1982: Arthur C. Clarke
- 1983: Francesco Carassa
- 1984: Eric Albert Ash
- 1985: Charles Kuen Kao
- 1986: Leonard Kleinrock
- 1987: Robert Wendell Lucky
- 1988: Federico Faggin
- 1989: Robert N. Hall
- 1990: Andrew J. Viterbi
- 1991: Paul Baran
- 1992: James L. Flanagan
- 1993: Izuo Hayashi
- 1994: Robert E. Kahn
- 1995: Jacob Ziv
- 1996: Gottfried Ungerboeck
- 1997: G. David Forney, Jr.
- 1998: Vinton G. Cerf
- 1999: James L. Massey
- 2000: Martin Hellman and Whitfield Diffie
- 2001: Herwig Kogelnik and Allan Snyder
- 2002: Tim Berners-Lee
- 2003: Robert Metcalfe and Robert G. Gallager
- 2004: Sergey Brin and Lawrence Page
- 2005: Claude Berrou
- 2006: John M. Cioffi
- 2007: Ronald L. Rivest
- 2008: David N. Payne
- 2009: Andrew Chraplyvy and Robert Tkach
- 2010: Charles Geschke and John Warnock
- 2011: Jack Wolf and Irwin M. Jacobs
- 2012: Henry Samueli
- 2013: Martin Cooper
- 2014: Arogyaswami Paulraj
- 2015: Peter Kirstein
- 2016: Bradford Parkinson
- 2017: Arun Netravali
- 2018: F. Thomson Leighton
- 2019: Paul Kocher and Taher Elgamal
- 2020: Andrea Goldsmith
- 2022: Siavash Alamouti
- 2023: Hari Balakrishnan
- 2024: Teresa H. Meng
- 2025: Nick McKeown
- 2026: Robert Calderbank

== See also ==
- Donald Davies – independently invented packet switching and modern data communication
- List of engineering awards
- NAB Marconi Radio Awards
