= M. Robert Aaron =

American electrical engineer (1922–2007)

- Born: August 21, 1922; Philadelphia, Pennsylvania, U.S.
- Died: June 16, 2007 (aged 84); West Palm Beach, Florida, U.S.
- Education: University of Pennsylvania (B.S., M.S.)
- Known for: Contributions to TAT-1 and T1 carrier system
- Awards: IEEE Alexander Graham Bell Medal (1978); Elected to National Academy of Engineering (1979)
- Honors: Fellow of Institute of Electrical and Electronics Engineers (IEEE); Fellow of American Association for the Advancement of Science (AAAS)
- Scientific career
- Fields: Electrical engineering, Telecommunications
- Institutions: Bell Labs

M. Robert Aaron (August 21, 1922 – June 16, 2007) was an American electrical engineer specializing in telecommunications.

Aaron was born in Philadelphia, served in the United States Coast Guard during World War II, received his bachelor's (1949) and master's degree (1951) in Electrical Engineering from the University of Pennsylvania, and in 1951 joined Bell Laboratories in Murray Hill, New Jersey. There he helped design networks for various transmission systems, including TAT-1, the first repeatered transatlantic telephone cable system. He was also a key contributor to design of T1, the initial T-carrier system.

Aaron was a member of the National Academy of Engineering (1979), Fellow of the Institute of Electrical and Electronics Engineers and American Association for the Advancement of Science, and co-recipient of the IEEE Alexander Graham Bell Medal (1978).

He died in West Palm Beach, Florida in 2007.

Awards
Preceded by Eberhardt Rechtin	IEEE Alexander Graham Bell Medal; 1978	Succeeded by Christian Jacobaeus
