= QUIKTRAN =

QUIKTRAN is a Fortran-like, interactive computer programming language with debugging facilities.

More than a Fortran-based programming language, QUIKTRAN was IBM's first entry in on-line Time Sharing in the 1960s. It ran on an IBM 7040/7044, using an IBM 7740 as a dial up communications processor. In 1967 an IBM data center supported over 400 commercial customers in a time-sharing environment; users could dial up and log into the Quiktran system. They could store their own Fortran programs in private libraries for later execution, or execute numerous IBM-supplied programs for applications including linear programming, communication network design, and business programs. The system on the receiving end allowed teletype or typewriter keyboards using data phones or acoustic modems to connect. It could support approximately 50 simultaneous users, The hardware used was an IBM 1301 40-platter disk for storage, and an IBM 7320 Magnetic Drum for program swapping. The QUIKTRAN system was superseded by Call/360. Quiktran and Call/360 were supported by Service Bureau Corp., a wholly owned subsidiary of IBM. SBC was later sold to Minneapolis-based company (Control Data Corporation). Source: Burt McGregor
