= Ceria-zirconia =

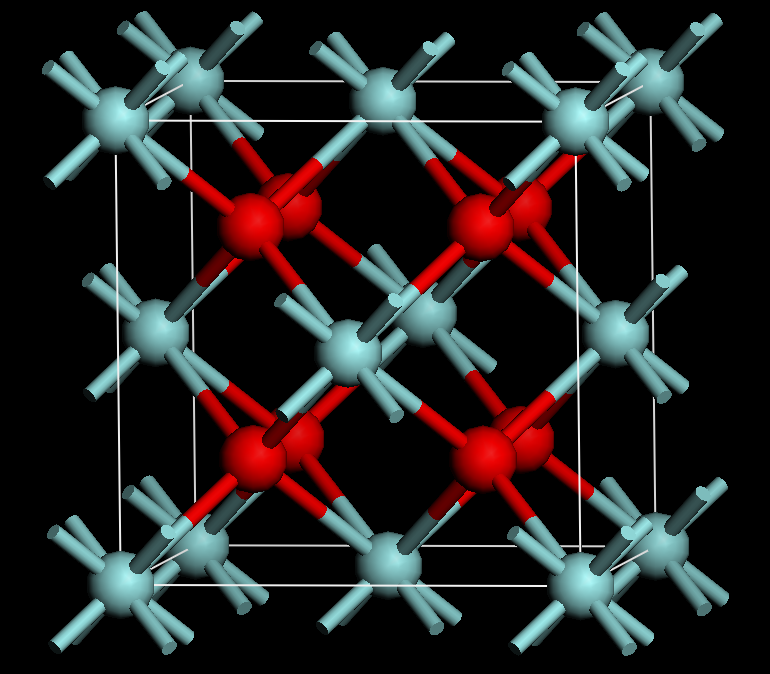
Fluorite-like crystal structure of ceria and cubic zirconia

Ceria-zirconia is a solid solution of cerium(IV) oxide (CeO_{2}, also known as ceria) and zirconium oxide (ZrO_{2}, also known as zirconia).

== Crystal structure and stability ==
The crystal structure adopted by ceria-zirconia depends on the Zr/Ce ratio and temperature. At very low Zr concentrations, ceria-zirconia exhibits the cubic fluorite structure, which is common to both pure ceria and cubic zirconia (pure zirconia normally only adopts a cubic structure at high temperatures). However, at higher Zr contents, other crystal structures are formed, including two different tetragonal phases at intermediate Zr concentrations, and a monoclinic phase at very high Zr concentrations.

There is both experimental and theoretical evidence showing that the decomposition of ceria-zirconia into Ce-rich and Zr-rich oxides is thermodynamically favorable in a wide range of solid solution compositions, which means that ceria-zirconia is metastable with respect to phase separation.

== Technological importance ==
Ceria-zirconia is widely used as a component in current three-way catalytic converters. The ceria-based component of the converter has several functions, including promoting the dispersion of the noble metals in the catalyst, but also storing and releasing oxygen. The incorporation of zirconium in modern converters, forming ceria-zirconia, improves the performance of the catalyst by enhancing the resistance of the material to sintering, and simultaneously increasing the ability of the oxide to accommodate oxygen vacancies in its structure.
