= Nancy Ho =

Taiwanese-American molecular biologist (born 1936)

Nancy W. Y. Ho
- 何汪瑗
- Born: 1936 (age 89–90); China
- Citizenship: American
- Education: National Taiwan University (BS); Temple University (MS); Purdue University (PhD)
- Awards: National Medal of Technology and Innovation
- Scientific career
- Fields: Molecular biology
- Workplaces: Purdue University

Nancy W. Y. Ho (Chinese: 何汪瑗; born 1936) is a Taiwanese-American molecular biologist who was the recipient of the 2013 USA National Medal of Technology and Innovation, awarded to her by President Barack Obama. The award is the highest honor for technological achievement bestowed by the President of the United States.

She was awarded the medal for: "The development of a yeast-based technology that is able to co-ferment sugars extracted from plants to produce ethanol, and for optimizing this technology for large-scale and cost-effective production of renewable biofuels and industrial chemicals."

== Early life ==
Ho was born in China. Ho grew up in Taiwan. She is Taiwanese American.

== Education ==
Ho earned her PhD in molecular biology in 1968, her masters from Temple University in 1960, and her undergraduate degree from National Taiwan University, Taiwan, in 1957.

== Career ==
In 2006, Ho founded GreenTech America Inc. in West Lafayette, Indiana. Ho is also the President of GreenTech America Inc. Ho is known for the yeast called Ho-Purdue Yeast.

Ho is a research professor emerita at Purdue University. Earlier on, she was a senior research scientist at Purdue Laboratory of Renewable Resources Engineering (LORRE). In 2007, she became a research professor at Purdue, in the School of Chemical Engineering.

For over 30 years, she has devoted research to develop the most successful yeast for the production of ethanol. This has considerable impact in the renewable energy field.

== Awards ==
- National Medal of Technology and Innovation (2013)

== Book ==
- Ho, Nancy (2018). The Miracle Yeast. LifeRich Publishing.
