= Irwin Lachman =

American engineer (1930–2025)

- Born: August 2, 1930; New York City, U.S.
- Died: April 18, 2025 (aged 94); Williamstown, Massachusetts, U.S.
- Education: Rutgers University (B.S.) (1952) Ohio State University (Ph.D.) (1955)
- Occupation: Engineer
- Years active: 1952–1994

Irwin Morris Lachman (August 2, 1930 – April 18, 2025) was an American engineer and a co-inventor of the catalytic converter.

== Background ==
Lachman was born on August 2, 1930, in Brooklyn, New York, and later moved to and grew up in Jersey Homesteads, New Jersey (later Roosevelt). He attended Upper Freehold Township High School (later renamed Allentown High School), received a B.S. in ceramic engineering from Rutgers University in 1952, and then a M.S. and a Ph.D. in ceramic engineering while at Ohio State University in 1953 and 1955. After serving in the United States Air Force, he worked for Thermo Materials, Inc. and Sandia National Laboratories before joining Corning’s ceramic research department in 1960. Lachman retired in 1994 and pursued his artistic interests by creating monoprints that he exhibited at galleries and shows.

Lachman died in Williamstown, Massachusetts on April 18, 2025, at the age of 94.

== Work ==
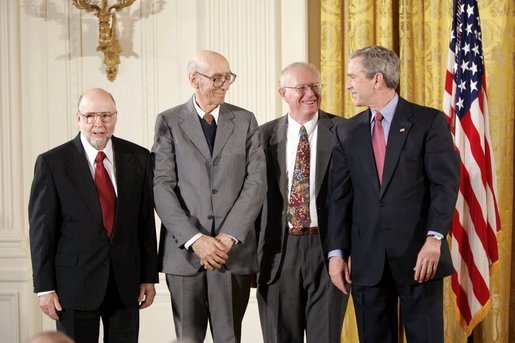
President George W. Bush awards the 2003 National Medal of Technology award to Corning Inc., scientists Ronald M. Lewis, left, Irwin Lachman, center, and Rodney D. Bagley

At Corning Glass Works, Lachman was a member of the team that invented the first inexpensive, mass-producible catalytic converter for automobiles operating internal combustion engines. In addition to Irwin Lachman, the team consisted of engineer Rodney Bagley and geologist Ronald Lewis. While working at Corning, Irwin Lachman co-invented the ceramic substrate found in almost all catalytic converters, which greatly reduce the amount of harmful pollutants in automotive emissions.

Lachman and his colleagues were critical in developing an efficient and feasible catalytic converter. Lachman realized ceramics could be ideally suited to meet the demands placed on a catalytic converter. The composition he worked on offered better resistance to sudden and extreme temperature fluctuations. Lachman’s fundamental ceramics technology ultimately decreases pollution released into the environment. Their work was a response to the Clean Air Act (1970) and reduced polluting emissions from the combustion process by 95%. Additionally, because the catalyst they used in their invention, platinum, required removing lead from gasoline as an additive, their device offered a secondary benefit to the environment by reducing lead pollution.

Working together in the early 1970s at Corning Inc. in Corning, N.Y., Lachman, Bagley and Lewis all used cellular ceramic technology to create the ceramic honeycomb that became the essential core component of catalytic converters. Lachman and Lewis worked on the project for two years to develop a new ceramic material that had all the key characteristics they needed: high temperature durability, low thermal expansion, low thermal conductivity at high temperatures, light weight and controlled porosity.

Lachman, along with Bagley and Lewis, were inducted into the National Inventors Hall of Fame in 2002 and received the 2003 National Medal of Technology at a White House ceremony. The team also won the International Ceramics Prize of the Academy for the Advanced Ceramics industry in 1996. Lachman held 47 U.S. patents, and has authored numerous technical papers.
