= Walter Robb (engineer) =

American engineer (1928–2020)

- Born: April 25, 1928; Harrisburg, Pennsylvania, U.S.
- Died: March 23, 2020 (aged 91); Schenectady, New York, U.S.
- Occupation(s): Research & Development (R&D) executive for General Electric

Walter Lee Robb (April 25, 1928 – March 23, 2020) was an American engineer, business executive, and philanthropist. In 2000, he was elected to the American Philosophical Society.

Born in Harrisburg, Pennsylvania, in April 1928, he was a recipient of the National Medal of Technology and Innovation in 1993. He was a Research & Development (R&D) executive for General Electric. He owned a few local sports teams, purchasing the minor-league hockey franchise of the Albany River Rats in 1998.

Robb died from COVID-19 at a hospital in Schenectady, New York, on March 23, 2020, at the age of 91.
