= Carl D. Keith =

American chemist

- Born: May 29, 1920
- Died: November 9, 2008 (aged 88)
- Education: Salem College, Depaul University, Indiana University
- Known for: invention of the 3 way catalytic converter
- Scientific career
- Fields: Chemistry

Carl Donald Keith (May 29, 1920 – November 9, 2008) was a chemist who was inventor of the three-way catalytic converter, which has played a dramatic role in reducing pollution from motor vehicles since their introduction in the mid-1970s.

Keith was born on May 29, 1920, in Stewart Creek, West Virginia, to Howard, a steelworker, and Mary Rawson Keith, who worked in a bakery. He received a bachelor's degree from Salem College in North Carolina in 1943, earned a master's degree in chemistry from Indiana University in 1945 and was awarded a doctorate from DePaul University in 1947.

From 1943 to 1957, Keith was a chemist at Sinclair Oil. He later was hired by Engelhard Industries.

From 1976 until his retirement from Engelhard in 1985, Keith was an executive vice president, president and finally chairman of the company.

== Catalytic converter ==
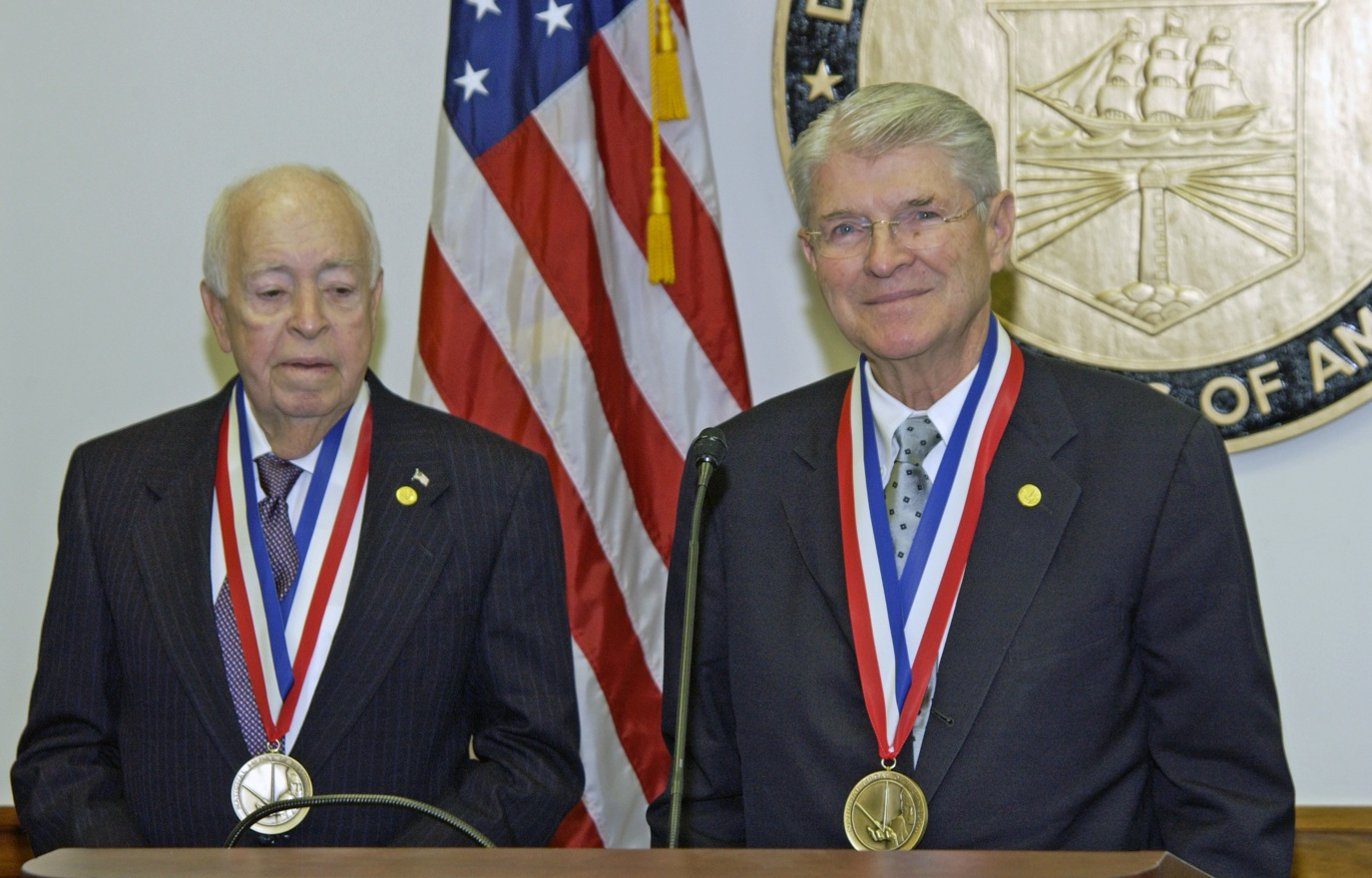
Carl D. Keith (left) and John J. Mooney at the award ceremony for the National Medal of Technology and Innovation for the invention, application and commercialization of the three-way catalytic converter (2003)

The 1970 amendments to the Clean Air Act required significant reductions in hydrocarbon, carbon monoxide and nitrogen oxide emissions. The converters available at the time were oxidation catalysts, which could handle hydrocarbon and carbon monoxide, but were ineffective in reducing nitrogen oxides. Car manufacturers and catalyst companies were trying to develop a multiple step process that would address hydrocarbons and carbon monoxide in one process while reducing nitrogen oxides in another.

The three-way catalyst developed by Keith and chemical engineer John J. Mooney with their team at Englehard allowed all three exhaust pollutants to be remediated using a single catalyst bed. Their solution to addressing the variations in air / fuel mixtures was to combine rare-earth oxides and base metal oxide components in the catalyst together with Platinum and Rhodium in a ceramic honeycomb with tiny passages coated with the catalytic material. This design ensured that the oxygen needed in the reactions was absorbed up when it was in excess and released when it was needed, allowing all three pollutants to be removed in a single catalytic component. The three-way catalytic converter reduces nitrogen oxides to nitrogen and oxygen, oxidizes carbon monoxide to carbon dioxide and oxidizes unburnt hydrocarbons to carbon dioxide and water.

The initial catalytic converters were installed in cars in the 1975 model year. In 1976, the three-way catalyst was introduced, which, after updates, has been able to eliminate 97% of tailpipe hydrocarbon emissions, 96% of carbon monoxide and 90% of nitrogen oxides produced in automobile engines and those used in light trucks and sport utility vehicles. A statement cited by The New York Times from the United States Environmental Protection Agency showed that cars today produce 98% less nitrogen oxide emissions than cars from the 1970s, and "the three-way catalytic converter is the greatest contributor to that reduction".

== Awards ==
In 2001, Keith and Mooney received the Walter Ahlstrom Prize, awarded in conjunction with the Finnish Academies of Technology, for their work in inventing and commercializing the three-way catalytic converter. Estimates were that by the time the award was received, the converters developed by Keith were installed in 80% of new cars manufactured worldwide and had prevented 56 million tons of hydrocarbons, 118 million tons of nitrogen oxides and 464 billion tons of carbon monoxide from being emitted as pollution in the 25 years since their introduction.

Together with Mooney, Keith was honored by the United States Patent and Trademark Office with the 2002 National Medal of Technology, awarded "For the invention, application to automobiles, and commercialization of the three-way catalytic converter. Through their persistent efforts, this technology is the key emission-control component in all new light-duty vehicles in the United States and throughout the world."

== Death ==
Keith was a resident of Marco Island, Florida. He died at age 88 on November 9, 2008, while visiting one of his daughters in New Bern, North Carolina. The cause of death was not immediately disclosed.
