= Monolith (catalyst support) =

Monolithic catalyst supports are extruded structures that are the core of many catalytic converters, most diesel particulate filters, and some catalytic reactors. Most catalytic converters are used for vehicle emissions control. Stationary catalytic converters can reduce air pollution from fossil fuel power stations.

== Properties ==
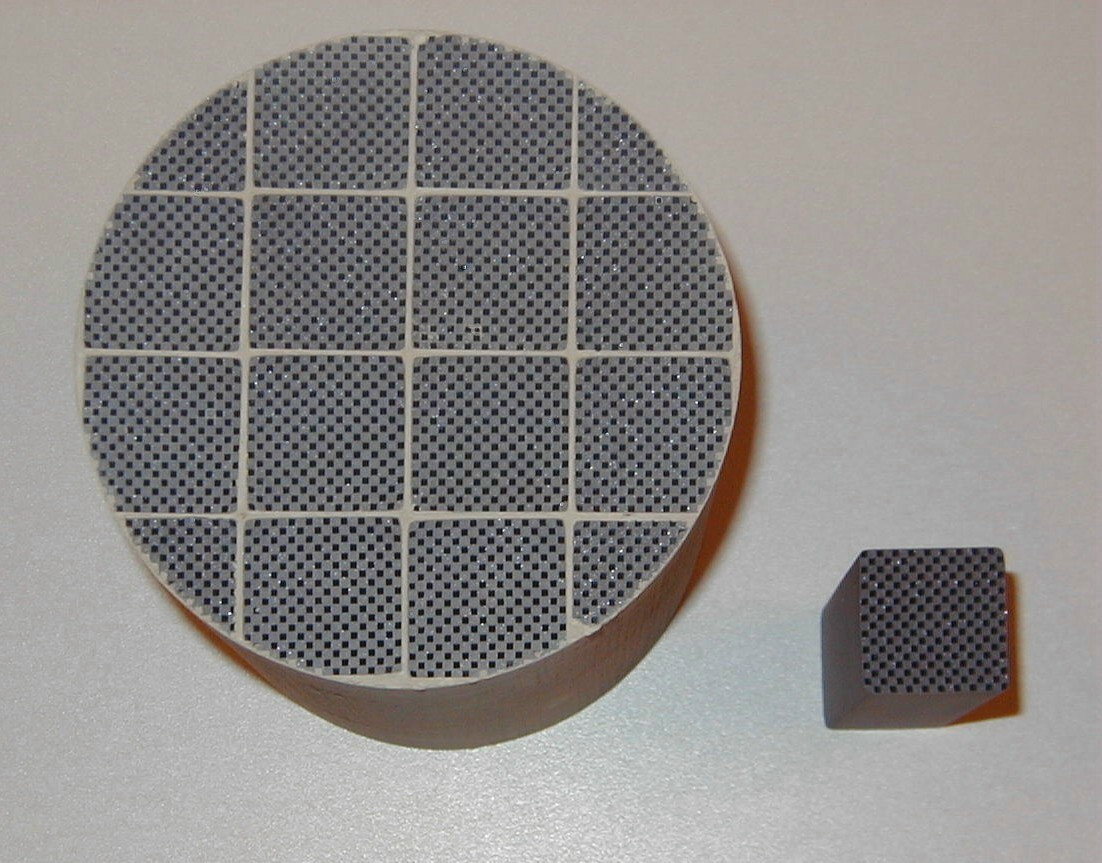
Diesel soot catalytic reduction device (SCR) made of silicon carbide monoliths

Monoliths for automotive catalytic converters are made of a ceramic that contains a large proportion of synthetic cordierite, 2MgO•2Al_{2}O_{3}•5SiO_{2}, which has a low coefficient of thermal expansion.

Each monolith contains thousands of parallel channels or holes, which are defined by many thin walls, in a honeycomb structure. The channels can be square, hexagonal, round, or other shapes. The hole density may be from 30 to 200 per cm^{2}, and the separating walls can be 0.05 to 0.3 mm. The many small holes have a much larger surface area than one large hole. High surface area facilitates catalytic reaction or filtration. The open spaces in the cross-sectional area are 72 to 87% of the frontal area, so resistance to the flow of gases through the holes is low, which minimizes energy consumed forcing gases through the structure.

The monolith is a substrate that supports a catalyst. After the monolith is complete, a washcoat is applied that deposits oxides and catalyst(s) (most commonly platinum, palladium, and/or rhodium) on the walls of the holes.

Alternative structures include corrugated metal and a packed bed of coated pellets or other shapes.

== Uses ==
- Diesel particulate filters (DPF)
- Catalytic incineration
- Catalyst support for chemical processes
- Vehicle emissions control
