= Victor B. Lawrence =

Ghanaian-American communications engineer

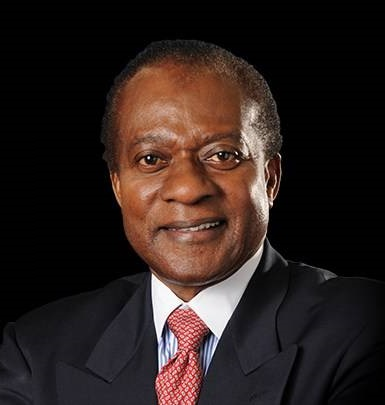
- Victor B. Lawrence
- Born: May 10, 1945 (age 80); Accra, Ghana
- Education: Achimota Secondary School, Imperial College of Science and Technology, University of London
- Occupations: Engineer, Scientist, Professor, and Entrepreneur

Victor B. Lawrence (born May 10, 1945, in Accra, Ghana) is a Ghanaian-American engineer credited with seminal contributions in digital signal processing for multimedia communications. During his 30-plus-year tenure at Bell Laboratories, Lawrence made extensive and fundamental personal contributions to voice, data, audio and video communications. He led numerous projects that significantly improved or enhanced every phase in the evolution of early low-speed and today's high-speed data communications. He is a Research Professor and Director of the Center for Intelligent Networked Systems (iNetS) at Stevens Institute of Technology, where he also served as Associate Dean. He was inducted into the National Inventors Hall of Fame in 2016 and is a laureate of the 2024 National Medal of Technology and Innovation. He is a Member of the National Academy of Engineering, a Fellow of the IEEE for contributions to the understanding of quantization effects in digital signal processors and the applications of digital signal processing to data communications, a Fellow of AT&T Bell Labs, and a Charter Fellow of the National Academy of Inventors.

== Career ==
Upon graduation, Lawrence worked as a development engineer in the United Kingdom and then spent two semesters lecturing at University of Science and Technology, Kumasi, now Kwame Nkrumah University of Science and Technology, in Ghana. Lawrence joined Bell Laboratories in 1974 and served in a number of roles over a 30-plus-year career at AT&T: as Supervisor in Data Communications Equipment Laboratory, Department head of Data Communication Research, Director of Advanced Multimedia Communications, and Vice President of Advanced Communications Technology before. Beginning in 1996, Lawrence lectured for several years at the Dwight D. Eisenhower School for National Security and Resource Strategy, formerly the Industrial College of the Armed Forces. As a visiting professor, he taught signal processing and data networking courses at the University of Pennsylvania, Rutgers University, Princeton University, Columbia University, and University of California, Berkeley. Lawrence also taught courses in Technology Management and Technology Incubation at Bell Laboratories to new engineers.

In 2005, Lawrence was appointed Director of the Center for Intelligent Networked Systems, and was named Associate Dean and Charles Batchelor Chair Professor of Engineering at the Stevens Institute of Technology. He has co-authored five books: Introduction to Digital Filters, Tutorials on Modem Communications, Intelligent Broadband Multimedia Networks, Design and Engineering of Intelligent Communications Systems, and The Art of Scientific Innovation. Lawrence holds more than twenty U.S. and international patents and has had more than forty-five papers in referenced journals and conference proceedings, covering the topics of digital signal processing and data communications.

== Contributions ==
1. Digital Signal Processing Leading the Transition from Analog to Digital Networks

Lawrence's innovations in the fields of digital signal processing and data communications helped drive the transition from analog to digital networks. When he started work in the 1970s, data transmission speeds over the Public Switched Telephone Network (PSTN) were limited to 300 bit/s; today speeds over copper are in the Gbps range. Lawrence's technical innovations and achievements have contributed significantly to this evolution. In the mid-1970s, he improved the design of digital filters, including the invention of bias-less rounding arithmetic. This technique, which is used to suppress oscillations and stabilize both fixed and adaptive digital filters, is implemented in most digital signal processing (DSP) chips on the market today. He performed the early analysis, reduction to practice, and the first real-time implementation, through which he discovered the existence of unexpected large-amplitude and very-long-period limit cycles. This work, which resulted in two patents (Patents #4,213,187 and #4,034,197) and the Best Paper Award of the IEEE Transactions on Circuits and Systems, has had a profound impact on the development of digital signal processors. These techniques were implemented in oscillators, tone detectors and generators used in digital telephone systems, PBXs and central office switches. In 1979, Lawrence implemented the first 9600 bit/s modem on a programmable digital signal processor, which operated in real time. In 1980, he co-invented multidimensional signal constellations, for which he received a patent, #4,457,004.

This work and related patents led to Lawrence's induction into the National Inventors Hall of Fame in 2016.

2. Early Internet Access Technology and Worldwide Data Communications

Lawrence was the architect and lead engineer for AT&T's first 2400 bit/s full-duplex modem for the PSTN. He developed the systems engineering requirements and testing plans for deployment in the AT&T, British Telecom, and NTT networks. He led the successful tests over transatlantic links of British and U.S. networks. This work led to the adoption of International Telecommunication Union (ITU) Standard V.22bis. He provided the analog specifications and the digital design for an integrated circuit development that led to the first Switched-Capacitor Integrated Modem designed to operate at both 1200 and 2400 bit/s.

Lawrence led the team that first proposed to the ITU and demonstrated the technical feasibility of trellis-coded, full-duplex echo-cancellation-based 9.6 kbit/s and 14.4 kbit/s modems over the public switched telephone network. He co-invented a start-up sequence for these echo-cancellation-based modems, which was compatible with echo control devices used in international networks. He verified the technical feasibility by carrying out tests over U.S., British, and Japanese networks and his results were the basis of acceptance by the ITU of recommendations V.32 and V.33. His work on high-speed modem/fax chip-sets led to the industry's most successful modem data-pump. This chip-set was also used in voice terminals for secure communications worldwide.

Lawrence also led the development of the first PCMCIA-based V.32bis and wireless data modems. Over the years, he continued to lead the innovations that resulted in V.34 (33.6 kbit/s) and V.90 (56 kbit/s) modems. These advances ushered in the era of low-cost, ubiquitous full-duplex data communications on a global basis. In fact, the universal availability of high-speed data connectivity stimulated the growth and widespread use of the Internet. Lawrence provided technical leadership as well as personal innovations resulting in fundamental improvements in the design of secure, reliable, and efficient global telecommunication networks.

Lawrence has been a strong advocate of international standards for data communication throughout his career and played a major role in the adoption of numerous standards, including V.22bis, V.32, V.33, V.34, and V.90. He directly contributed to several of these standards as Rapporteur and supported the work of others.

This work led to the IEEE Medal for International Communication awarded in 2004 and led to membership in the National Academy of Engineers in 2003.

3. Digital Subscriber Loop Access Technology

Lawrence's pioneering work on high-speed transceivers for the local loop and for premises applications led to the development of a variety of Digital Subscriber Loop (DSL) technologies, many of which are deployed today for broadband services and high-speed Internet access. His contributions included characterization and modeling of millions of access loops worldwide and the end-to-end systems engineering and performance characterization. He led the team that developed the first HDSL prototype that was used in the Ameritech network to prove the technical feasibility of broadband access over copper wires, leading to the HDSL international standard.

As Head of the Digital Techniques Department, Lawrence focused on creating algorithms using signal processing for network applications, including network echo cancelers, packet switches and multiplexers, noise cancelers, and performance monitoring equipment for voice and facsimile traffic. In 1988, as Head of the Data Communications Research Department, he directed the development of a family of modems based on the AT&T 16A Digital Signal Processor chip. The resulting modem/fax chip-set became the industry's most successful modem data-pump and positioned Lucent Microelectronics Division as the world leader in this field. Variations of this chip-set were used in AT&T Paradyne's ACCUCOM modem and AT&T Federal System's secure-voice terminal and line-encryptor modem. It was also incorporated into the secure phone used by the U.S. president.

4. ATM and IP Switching for Premises and Core Network

Lawrence provided technical leadership for the development of a successful Asynchronous Transfer Mode (ATM) switching chip-set (ATLANTA), which has been leveraged by major equipment vendors and are deployed in data networks worldwide. Lawrence and his team made a significant impact on the networking industry through their contributions to ATM and Internet Protocol (IP) networks. Their work is characterized by a combination of creative, timely ideas for important networking problems and aggressive prototyping and productization of those ideas. Lawrence demonstrated innovative engineering practices when he and his team applied novel ATM switching and architecture ideas to design a world-class set of integrated circuit chips. Most of the leading ATM switch suppliers have used these devices in their systems, enabling successful data networks.

Lawrence's individual research and joint research with his colleagues have generated key innovations in network architectures, protocols, routing, restoration, and resource management algorithms. Almost all of these have been accepted by major standards bodies, implemented in key products from major telecommunication equipment vendors, and deployed in many packet networks supporting Internet and Intranets. These include wireline backbone, wireline metro and access, and all forms of wireless networks.

5. Digital Video and HDTV

Lawrence led the team that developed Bell Labs high-definition television (HDTV) video encoder and transferred this technology from the laboratory to a commercial standards-based system. This project began with an FCC Advisory Committee on Advanced TV (ACATS) in 1987, the testing phase in 1991–92, the formation of the Grand Alliance between AT&T, Zenith, Sarnoff, General Instrument, Philips, and Thomson, and MIT resulting in the FCC/ACATS HDTV Standard in 1995. He was instrumental in creating the Lucent digital video business, which won a Primetime Emmy Award in 1997. Their work on HDTV/digital TV video encoders was used in over 150 TV stations and in many broadband networks worldwide. It was also used to broadcast John Glenn's space shuttle flight in the late 1990s, which was viewed by millions of people around the world. The digital HDTV system they built and variations of the video encoder and decoder chips that they developed have been commercialized by consumer electronics companies such as Zenith, RCA, NHK, Sony, Toshiba, Panasonic, Samsung Electronics, and LG Electronics. The same video compression technologies are used in both Android and IOS smart phones for video streaming, video messaging, and video communications.

This team continued working on the HDTV Grand Alliance Phase 2 system. They proposed a modified 4D trellis code and also designed and implemented many simulation models including a Vestigial Sideband Band transmitter, Grand Alliance multi-path channel model, segment sync detection, airplane flutter channel model, automatic gain control, and field sync detection modules. He also continued to guide the chip development team on transceiver issues.

Lawrence's efforts in this area placed U.S. business in a leadership position in the areas of digital audio, video broadcasting and HDTV. Further, this work in video has resulted in key contributions to a number of international standards, including MPEG2 and the FCC ATSC standard for terrestrial broadcast.

6. Digital Audio Broadcast

Lawrence's work impacted not only entertainment video but also broadcast satellite radio. His Bell Labs team did the systems engineering work for Sirius Radio. They built the first studio encoder and the receiver chip-set for the Sirius Radio Satellite system, which is still being used in SiriusXM and licensed by many semiconductor suppliers. They also made advances in digital audio by developing both in-band adjacent channel (IBAC) and in-band on channel (IBOC) transmission schemes for audio broadcasting over FM channels.

7. Submarine Fiber Optic Cables and Advances of the African Internet

In 1993, Lawrence began championing the effort to bring fiber optic connectivity from the U.S. to Africa. He led the team that developed the systems engineering requirements and planned for the longest ever submarine cable of 39,000 kilometers using advanced optical wavelength-division multiplexing and electronics technologies, Africa One Cable. This resulted in an optical fiber ring around Africa. Portions of this design are used in the SAT 3, ACE, and WACS Cables from South Africa, along the west coast of Africa, to Portugal. Other cables using his designs were implemented from South Africa along the east coast through the Horn of Africa to the U.S. with branches to Asia. These are fully-automated submarine telecommunication networks with unique provisioning, self-healing, and self-management capabilities. The African Union Development Agency, NEPAD, adopted the Africa One concept and named the design Uhurunet and Umojanet networks, meaning Freedom net and Unity net, respectively, in Swahili, ensuring all African coastal countries are connected to the Internet. The current Google Submarine cable, Aquino, and 2 Africa Cable by Meta (Facebook) are based on their initial designs. Lawrence's vision was to vastly improve the communications between Africa and the rest of the world, increase commerce and trade for companies, and provide security alerts from Africa to other areas. This improved the communications infrastructure of some of the world's poorest countries, improving economic development, and enabling these countries to become part of the global information community.

He was awarded the IEEE Simon Ramo Medal for leadership in world-wide data communications networks in 2007.

8. National Secure Voice Systems

Lawrence's work on high-speed modem/fax chip sets led to the industry's most successful modem data pump. This chip-set was also used in voice terminals for secure communications worldwide. He was the lead systems engineer, technical leader, and manager who developed the U.S. Government's Future Secure Voice System (FSVS) terminal and the initial testing over the continental U.S. secure network. For several years, this FSVS terminal was used by the U.S. president and the Chairman of the Joint Chief of Staff and other Generals and military personnel. These terminals included major innovations in providing services to highly mobile and geographically dispersed troops and others away from fixed telecommunication networks. Examples included rapidly deployable forward units of armed forces, remote medicine, and emergency response teams.

9. Contributions to Student Education and Social Welfare

Since 2015, Lawrence has made significant contributions to the development of STEM education for high school and middle school students in New Jersey. He currently serves as a Trustee of New Jersey Center for Teaching and Learning (NJCTL), which has developed a progressive pedagogy for STEM education. The innovative curricula, AI-driven technologies, and online course material have been shown to be very useful in improving STEM test scores for New Jersey students including children in urban inner-city challenged communities. In 2019, New Jersey ranked first in AP Physics, first in SAT Physics II and second in AP Chemistry and SAT Chemistry II scores. In addition to his service with NJCTL, and through his affiliation with the National Inventors Hall of Fame, Lawrence has met with inner- city mayors and minority students to promote STEM education. He has also visited historic black colleges and universities to mentor professors and students.

10. R&D Globalization

Lawrence has been a key proponent of R&D globalization. As Vice President of Advanced Communications Technology at Bell Labs, he directly supported systems engineering developments and practices in Malaysia, New Zealand, China, Brazil, and other countries. He was a Member of South African President Mbeki's International Advisory group on ICT, Chairman of the Broadband Advisory Committee to the South African Government, and a Director of the Board of Telkom South Africa.

== Education ==
Victor Lawrence attended Achimota School, Achimota, Ghana, from 1957 to 1964. He then proceeded to Imperial College of Science and Technology at the University of London to obtain his Bachelor of Science degree in 1968, his M.S. degree in 1969, and his Ph.D. degree in 1972, all in electrical engineering.

== Awards and honors ==
Lawrence has received numerous awards and honorary degrees, including:

- 1981: Guillemin-Cauer Prize Award, IEEE Circuits & Systems Society
- 1984: J. Harry Karp Best Paper Award at Interface '84
- 1986: University of California at Berkeley, Chancellor's Distinguished Lecture Series
- 1987: Fellow of IEEE
- 1992: Fellow of AT&T Bell Labs
- 1995: Black Engineer for Outstanding Technical Contributions
- 1997: Emmy Award for HDTV Grand Alliance Standard
- 2000: IEEE Millennium Medal
- 2003: Member of National Academy of Engineering
- 2004: IEEE Award in International Communication
- 2007: IEEE Simon Ramo Medal for leadership in world-wide data communications networks
- 2012: Charter Fellow of National Academy of Inventors (NAI)
- 2016: National Inventors Hall of Fame Inductee
- 2025: National Medal of Technology and Innovation.
