= John J. Mooney =

American chemical engineer (1930–2020)

- Born: April 6, 1930; Paterson, New Jersey, U.S.
- Died: June 16, 2020 (aged 90); Wyckoff, New Jersey, U.S.
- Education: Seton Hall University, New Jersey Institute of Technology, Fairleigh Dickinson University
- Occupation: Chemical Engineer
- Awards: National Medal of Technology (1974), Walter Ahlstrom Prize

John Joseph Mooney (April 6, 1930 – June 16, 2020) was an American chemical engineer who was co-inventor of the three-way catalytic converter, which has helped reduce pollution from cars since the mid-1970s

== Early life and education ==
Mooney grew up in Paterson, New Jersey, where he attended St. Georges Grammar School and then St. Joseph's High School, graduating in 1947. Mooney then spent ten years working for the Public Service Electric and Gas Company (PSE&G) while attending Seton Hall University, where he completed his Bachelor of Science degree in 1955.

He spent the next few years with the United States Army. He then continued his education at Newark College of Engineering (now New Jersey Institute of Technology), where he earned a Master of Science in chemical engineering in 1960.

Mooney also earned an MBA in marketing from Fairleigh Dickinson University in 1992 while working at Engelhard.

Mooney was awarded an honorary Doctor of Science degree (honoris causa) in 2007 by his alma mater New Jersey Institute of Technology for his outstanding achievements in the fields of environmental protection and automotive engineering.

== Career ==
While serving in the United States Army from 1955 to 1956, Mooney was assigned to a series of nuclear tests in the Pacific Ocean at Enewetak Atoll in the Marshall Islands, which included 17 atom bomb and two hydrogen bomb tests. Mooney was as close as 7 1/2 miles from fission bomb tests.

Mooney came to Engelhard in 1960, after graduate school, as a result of a connection made in an electrochemical engineering course. He worked at the company's Gas Equipment Division. Among his first tasks there were purification of hydrogen, purification and catalysis of ammonia into hydrogen and nitrogen and a process for using a ruthenium catalyst to produce hydrogen from liquid ammonia for the United States Air Force. As a result, the Air Force was able to easily supply hydrogen for weather balloons, since it was more efficient to ship liquid ammonia to distant locations than cylinders of gas.

The 1970 amendments to the Clean Air Act required significant reductions in hydrocarbon, carbon monoxide and nitrogen oxide emissions. The converters available at the time were oxidation catalysts, which could handle hydrocarbon and carbon monoxide, but were ineffective in reducing nitrogen oxides. Car manufacturers and catalyst companies were trying to develop a multiple step process that would address hydrocarbons and carbon monoxide in one process while reducing nitrogen oxides in another.

Chemist Carl D. Keith and Mooney with their team at Engelhard came up with the first production catalytic converter in 1973. The three-way catalyst developed by them allowed all three exhaust pollutants (hydrocarbon, carbon monoxide, and nitrogen oxides) to be remedied using a single catalyst bed. Their solution to addressing the variations in air/fuel mixtures was to combine rare-earth oxides and base metal oxide components in the catalyst together with Platinum and Rhodium in a ceramic honeycomb with tiny passages coated with the catalytic material. This design ensured that the oxygen needed in the reactions was absorbed when it was in excess and released when it was needed, allowing all three pollutants to be removed in a single catalytic component. The three-way catalytic converter reduces nitrogen oxides to nitrogen and oxygen, oxidizes carbon monoxide to carbon dioxide and oxidizes unburnt hydrocarbons to carbon dioxide and water.

== Accomplishments ==
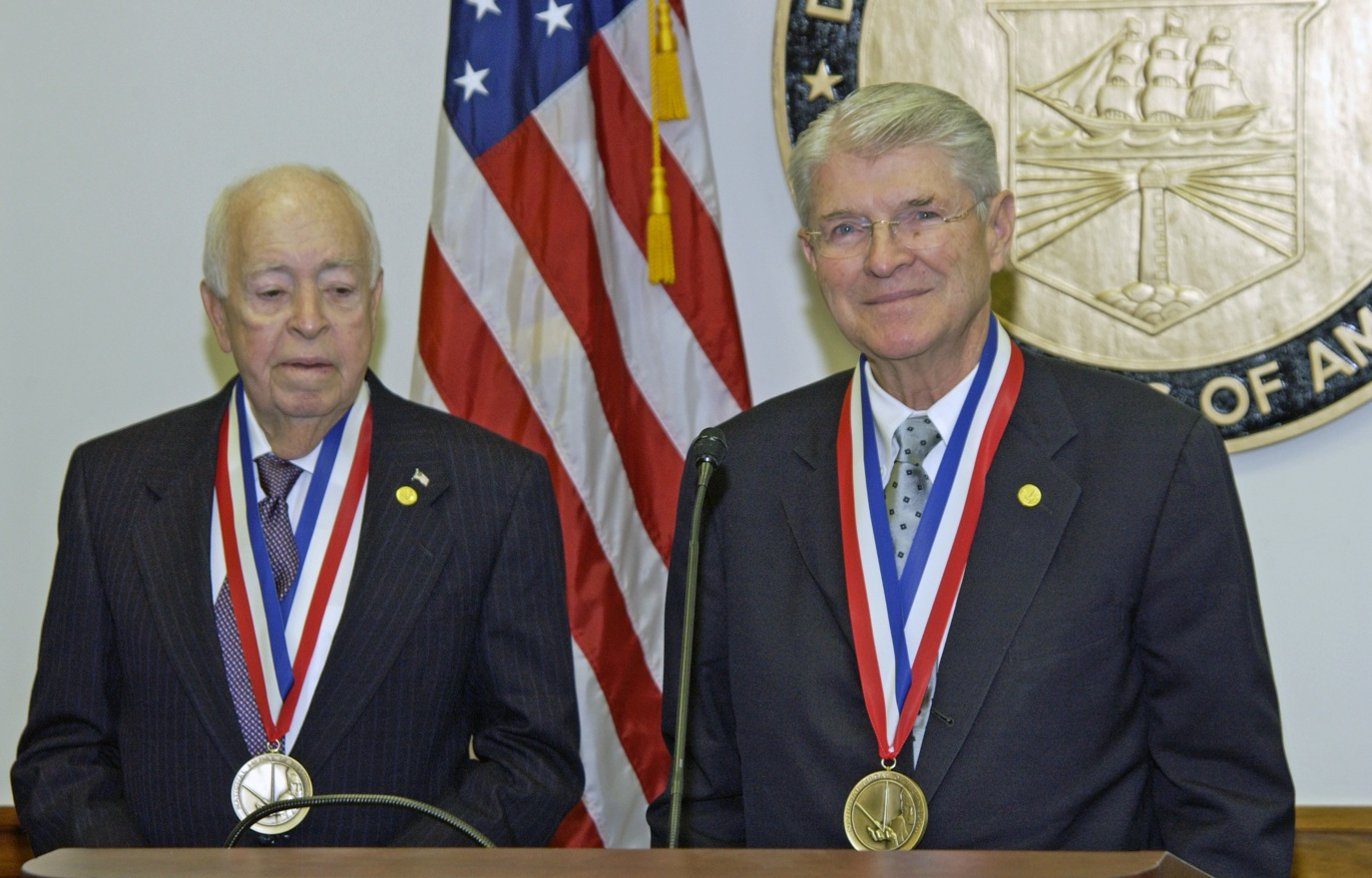
Carl D. Keith and John J. Mooney (right) at the award ceremony for the National Medal of Technology and Innovation for the invention, application and commercialization of the three-way catalytic converter (2003)

Mooney was elected a Fellow of Society of Automotive Engineers (SAE) in 1990 for his efforts in exhaust emission control.

In 2001, Keith and Mooney received the Walter Ahlstrom Prize, awarded in conjunction with the Finnish Academies of Technology, for their work in inventing and commercializing the three-way catalytic converter. Estimates were that by the time the award was received, the converters developed by Keith were installed in 80% of new cars manufactured worldwide and had prevented 56 million tons of hydrocarbons, 118 million tons of nitrogen oxides and 464 billion tons of carbon monoxide from being emitted as pollution in the 25 years since their introduction.

Together with Keith, Mooney was honored by the United States Patent and Trademark Office with the 2002 National Medal of Technology, awarded "For the invention, application to automobiles, and commercialization of the three-way catalytic converter. Through their persistent efforts, this technology is the key emission-control component in all new light-duty vehicles in the United States and throughout the world."

Mooney was awarded a total of 17 patents, the latest being one for a catalytic converter for the small two-stroke engines, used in chainsaws, lawn mowers, and leaf blowers. His invention reduced hydrocarbon emissions by as much as 70%, improved fuel efficiency and added up to 40% more power while addressing the pollution of an engine that often produces large amounts of pollution due to the lubricating oil mixed with the fuel.

As President of the Environmental and Energy Technology and Policy Institute, Mooney has worked with the Partnership for Clean Fuels and Vehicles of the United Nations Environment Programme to help end the use of leaded gasoline throughout the world. As of 2002, there were 51 countries in Sub-Saharan Africa in which leaded gasoline was still in use. By responding to issues of valve seat recession, and showing that lead in gasoline did not help solve the problem, Mooney was part of an effort that had 50 of these 51 countries in Africa ban leaded gasoline by the end of 2006.

== Retirement ==
He retired from Engelhard in 2003, having spent 43 years working for the firm.

Mooney was a resident of Wyckoff, New Jersey.

Mooney died on June 16, 2020, after a stroke.
