= Rakesh Agrawal (chemical engineer) =

American chemical engineer

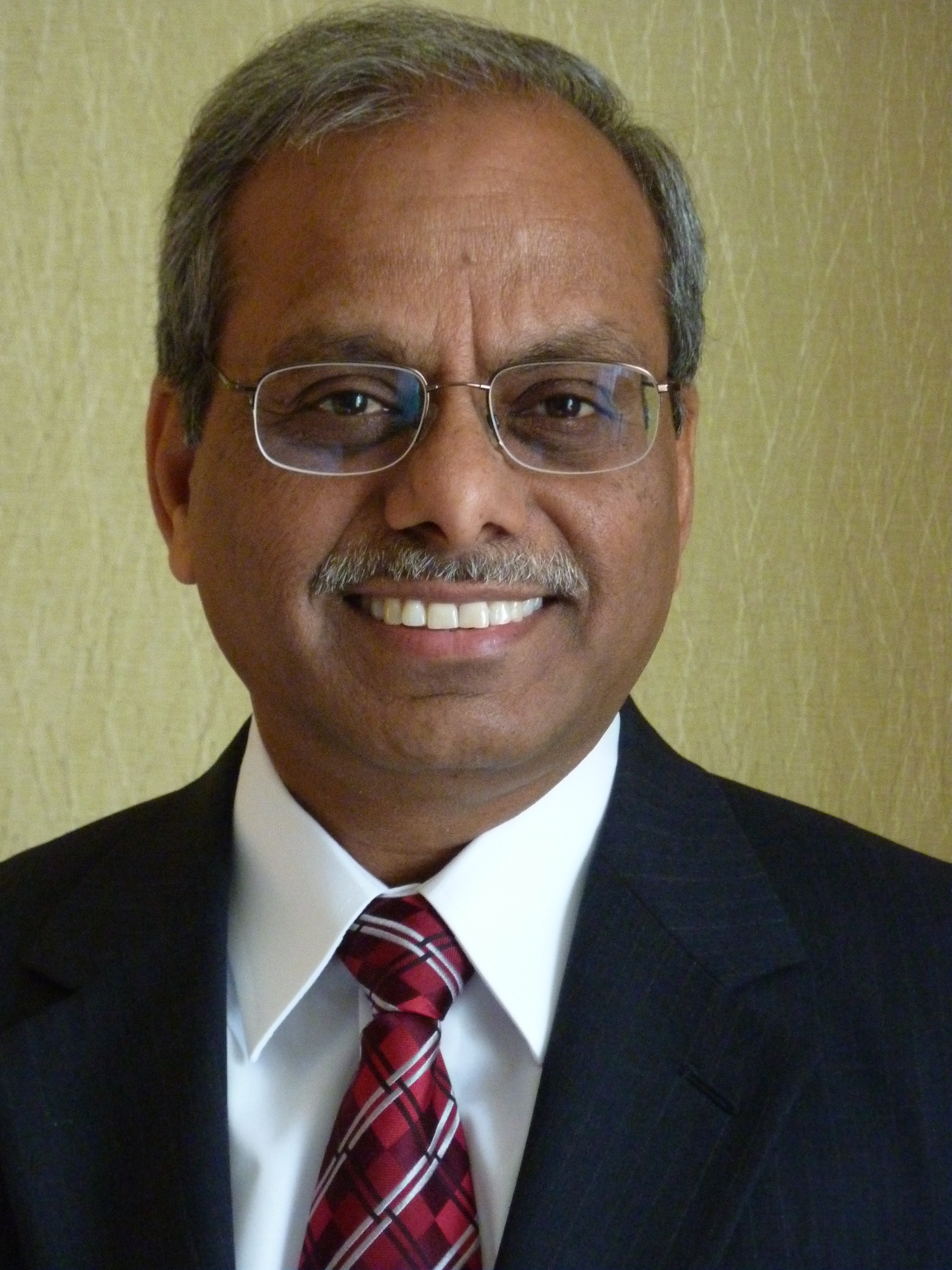
- Agrawal in 2011
- Education: Indian Institute of Technology Kanpur B.Tech., 1975; University of Delaware M.ChE., 1977; Massachusetts Institute of Technology Sc.D., 1980
- Known for: Contributions to separations and gas liquefaction, renewable energy
- Scientific career
- Fields: Chemical engineering
- Workplaces: Air Products (1980–2004); Purdue University (2004–present)

Rakesh Agrawal is the Winthrop E. Stone Distinguished Professor of Chemical Engineering at Purdue University in West Lafayette, Indiana. He is a chemical engineer known for contributions to separations, cryogenic gas separation and liquefaction, and for contributions to renewable energy including the conversion of biomass to chemicals and fuels, inorganic solar cell fabrication, and the synergistic use of solar energy.

== Early life and education ==
Dr. Agrawal received a B.Tech. in chemical engineering from the Indian Institute of Technology in Kanpur, India, in 1975; a M. Ch.E. from the University of Delaware in Dover, Delaware in 1977, and an Sc.D. in chemical engineering from the Massachusetts Institute of Technology (MIT) in Cambridge, Massachusetts in 1980.

== Career ==
In 1980, Rakesh Agrawal joined Air Products in Trexlertown, Pennsylvania, where he was appointed to Air Products Fellow.

In 2002, Agrawal was elected as a member of the National Academy of Engineering for contributions to the development and worldwide implementation of high-efficiency and high-purity cryogenic and non-cryogenic gas separation processes.

=== Contributions to separations and gas liquefaction ===
While at Air Products, Dr. Agrawal contributed to improvements in the efficiency of natural gas liquefaction, electronic gases manufacturing, cryogenic processing and gas separation. He led the development of the APX process for natural gas liquefaction that more than doubled the production from a single train. For semiconductor applications, Agrawal invented Column-Plus and Double Column-Plus ultra high purity (UHP) nitrogen and UHP liquid oxygen processes that reduce product impurities to less than one part per billion.

He invented an efficient process to recover refrigeration from liquefied natural gas to produce liquid nitrogen and oxygen.

Agrawal introduced several firsts in the arena of separations using distillation. For multicomponent separations, he introduced a new class of satellite column arrangements and a new superstructure that completed the set of basic column configurations available for distillation. He discovered a solution to the long-standing problem of making highly energy efficient thermally coupled columns operable by making vapor flow between columns unidirectional.

Agrawal presented a generalized framework to convert classical two-way thermal coupling to one-way liquid only transfer, thereby eliminating the challenge involved with the intercolumn vapor transfer between the thermally coupled distillation columns. This enabled the creation of multi-effect distillation analogs of thermally-coupled distillation columns resulting in a further potential for up to 50% reduction in the energy consumption of the already efficient thermally coupled configuration.

Contrary to the assumption that fully thermally coupled systems are the most energy efficient among the basic configurations, Agrawal showed that the thermodynamic efficiency of this system can often be worse than the other configurations. In 2001, for process intensification, he introduced a number of dividing wall column schemes including ones for side rectifier and side stripper configurations.

In 2003, Agrawal extended the concept of using dividing wall columns for batch distillation. Later his team introduced a new class of dividing wall columns and a generalized method to draw the corresponding dividing wall column for any given thermally coupled configuration. First, he led the development of the Shah and Agrawal method to elucidate all feasible basic n-1 distillation column configurations for the separation of an n-component non-azeotropic mixture with n greater than 3, and then in collaboration with professor Mohit Tawarmalani, developed optimization methods to rank-list these thousands to millions of configurations according to their heat duty, exergy, and cost.

Agrawal has also published methods to draw membrane cascades using a limited number of compressors for high recovery of products at high purity.

In analogy to multicomponent distillation configurations, he introduced membrane cascade schemes for multi-component gas separation. These membrane cascades can also be utilized for liquid separations by replacing compressors with pumps.

=== Contributions to renewable energy ===
Since joining Purdue University in 2004, Agrawal has focused on creating more energy-efficient and low-cost processes for generating renewable energy. He has outlined novel biomass conversion processes in which no biomass carbon is left unconverted to fuel. He suggested: (i) use of H2 from a renewable energy source in processes such as H2 CAR, and (ii) an H2Bioil process with biomass hydropyrolysis at a high pressure followed by immediate downstream hydrodeoxygenation to yield high energy density oil in two simple steps.

The H2Bioil process was successfully demonstrated through experiments and several companies have adapted the process and its variations.

Agrawal has proposed methods for the solution-based fabrication of thin-film inorganic solar cells. For the nanoparticle ink-based route, his group achieved the highest inorganic solar cell efficiencies for Cu2Zn(Sn,Ge)Se4 (9.4%) and Cu(In,Ga)Se2 (15%).

His team was the first to synthesize (1) Cu2ZnSnS4 nanoparticles and tailor the bandgap of Cu2ZnSnSe4 through partial substitution of Sn with Ge, and Cu with Ag; and (2) promising Cu3AsS4 and their thin films for solar cells.

Agrawal and his team devised an integrated solar thermal power cycle with daytime coproduction of hydrogen and electricity along with H2 storage followed by nighttime combustion of stored H2 using water as a working fluid to supply electricity around the clock with calculated overall sun to electricity efficiencies of 34% to 45%. This cycle stores energy with efficiencies similar to batteries but at a much higher storage density. To address the intermittency of solar energy, for storage of electricity at GWhr levels, Agrawal devised cycles using hydrocarbons and liquid CO_{2} as circulating fluids to supply electricity around the clock.

Agrawal's current research is on the use of photovoltaic (PV) modules on agriculture land to cogenerate electricity while producing food, the concept of PV aglectric farming. Unlike current PV modules that block sunlight and damage crops, Agrawal's group has suggested new PV modules that divert solar spectrum photons to plants while using the rest for electricity generation.

In collaboration with a team of experts from the Colleges of Agriculture and Engineering at Purdue University, he is leading an experimental and modelling study at the Purdue University's farm to demonstrate the concept of PV aglectric farming for major crops such as corn and soybean.

== Awards and honors ==
Agrawal is the recipient of numerous awards. He received the National Medal of Technology and Innovation in 2011 from U.S. President Barack Obama, "[f]or an extraordinary record of innovations in improving the energy efficiency and reducing the cost of gas liquefaction and separation. These innovations have had significant positive impacts on electronic device manufacturing, liquefied gas production, and the supply of industrial gases for diverse industries." Agrawal has received several distinctions from the American Institute of Chemical Engineers including the Alpha Chi Sigma Award for Chemical Engineering Research (2017); the Founders Award for Outstanding Contributions to the Field of Chemical Engineering (2011); the Fuels and Petrochemicals Division Award (2008); Institute Lecturer (2005); the Chemical Engineering Practice Award (2006); the Clarence G. Gerhold Award, Separations Division (2001); and the Institute Award for Excellence in Industrial Gases Technology (1998). The American Chemical Society has honored Agrawal with the Award in Separations Science and Technology (2017).

Agrawal was the youngest ever recipient of Air Products and Chemicals' most prestigious Chairman's Award (1992). Other awards he received from Air Products and Chemicals include the Extraordinary Quality Award (1992); the Diamond Award (2001); and the Equipment Innovation Award (2003). In addition, Agrawal received the Industrial Research Institute Innovation Research Achievement Award (2007). Agrawal's international distinctions include the Distinguished Alumnus Award, Indian Institute of Technology, Kanpur (2012), the inaugural Excellence in Gas Processing Award from the Annual Gas Processing Symposium, Qatar (2009), and the J&E Hall Gold Medal, Institute of Refrigeration, UK (2004).

Agrawal is a member of the U.S. National Academy of Engineering (2002); Fellow of the American Academy of Arts and Sciences (2013); Foreign Fellow of the Indian National Academy of Engineering (2011); Fellow of the U.S. National Academy of Inventors (2014); Fellow of the American Institute of Chemical Engineers (AIChE) (2009); Faculty Fellow of the Hagler Institute for Advanced Study, Texas A&M University (2014); Distinguished Member of the National Society of Collegiate Scholars (2014); Member of Sigma Xi (2017), and Honorary Fellow of the Indian Institute of Chemical Engineers (2001).

Agrawal has received numerous awards from Purdue University including the Philip C. Wankat Graduate Teaching Award in Chemical Engineering (2019); the Shreve Award for Excellence in Undergraduate Teaching (2013); and the Morrill Award (2014), which is the highest award Purdue University confers upon a faculty member for excellence in all three dimensions of teaching, research and engagement. Agrawal was also inducted into Purdue's Innovator Hall of Fame (2015).

Agrawal has delivered numerous named lectures at universities including the Regents' Lecturer, University of California, Los Angeles (2004); the Texas Institute of Advanced Studies, now Hagler Institute for Advanced Studies, Eminent Scholar Lecturer, Texas A&M University (2015); Berkeley Lectures, University of California, Berkeley (2015); the Distinguished Lecture of the Missouri Science & Technology Academy of Chemical Engineers, Rolla, MO, (2019); the Professor B. D. Tilak Visiting Fellowship Lecture, Institute of Chemical Technology, University of Mumbai, India (2004); the Prof. C.V. Seshadri Memorial Distinguished Lecture, IIT Bombay, Mumbai, India, (2014); the Annual KAIST CBE Global Distinguished Lecturer, Korea, (2013). Agrawal was the Allan P. Colburn Honorary Lecturer at E. I. du Pont de Nemours and Company (2013).

Agrawal has delivered numerous named lectures at conferences including the Peter V. Danckwerts Lecture at the 10th World Congress of Chemical Engineering, Barcelona, Spain (2017) and the C. K. Murthy Memorial Lecture, Indian Institute of Chemical Engineers (2008). Honorary Professorships held by Agrawal include the V.V. Mariwala Visiting Professorship, UICT, Mumbai, India (2007); the ExxonMobil Visiting Chair Professor, Department of Chemical and Biomolecular Engineering, National University of Singapore, (2011-2014); and the Dr. Balwant S. Joshi Distinguished Visiting Professorship, Institute of Chemical Technology, Mumbai, India (2019-2020).

Agrawal is married to Manju Agrawal and they have two sons, Udit and Numit.

== Professional service ==
Agrawal has been a member of the technology boards of Air Products and Chemicals (2004-2007), Dow Chemical (2007-2014), Kyrogen Ltd. (200-2010), Weyerhaeuser (2008-2009), ATMI (2010-2012), and the Engineering Advisory Board of Genomatica (2009-2013). He was also a member of Aspen Tech Academy, Aspen Tech (2012-2017). He has been an Advisory Council member of the Chemical and Biochemical Engineering Department of Cornell University (2002-2007), the Department of Chemical and Biomolecular Engineering of the University of Delaware (2012–present), the Department of Chemical and Biomolecular Engineering of Lehigh University (2016-2020), and Chemical Engineering Department of Worcester Polytechnic Institute, Worcester, MA (2007-2012). He was a Member of the Bourns College of Engineering Council of Advisors, University of California, Riverside (2003-2005). He is a member of the Wanger Institute for Sustainable Energy Research (WISER) Board of Advisors, Illinois Institute of Technology Chicago (2009–present ). He is currently a member of the Technical Review Panel for the Materials, Chemicals, & Computational Science, National Renewable Energy Lab (NREL), Golden, CO, (2019–present).

Agrawal has served on various committees of the U.S. National Academy of Engineering (NAE) including the Peer Committee of the Chemical Engineering Section (2004-2007), and Committee on Membership (CoM) (2017-2020). He served as Vice Chair (2011) and then as Chair (2012) of the Chemical Engineering Section of the NAE. He was a participant in the NAE workshop on 'Educate to Innovate', Washington DC, October 2013. He is currently a member of the NAE Energy Working Group (EWG). He served on the National Research Council (NRC) Board on Energy and Environmental Sciences (BEES) (2005–11). He participated on the Committee on Alternatives and Strategies for Future Hydrogen Production and Use (2002-2004) that produced a study report on The Hydrogen Economy, Opportunities, Barriers, and R&D Needs. He also participated in the NRC Committee on Assessment of Resource Needs for Fuel Cell and Hydrogen Technologies (2006-2008) which resulted in the publication of Transitions to Alternative Transportation Technologies – A Focus on Hydrogen. He has served on various NRC panels including National Academies' Renewables Panel for the Committee on America's Energy Future (2007-2008).^{−}

Agrawal has been a volunteer in many American Institute of Chemical Engineers (AIChE) activities. He served on its Board of Directors (2006-2008); and as a member of the Chemical Engineering Technology Operating Council (CTOC) (1999-2007) and as its chair in 2002. He has served on several AIChE committees that include: the Awards Committee (1999-2003), Publications Quality Team (1995-1996), AIChE Energy Commission (2005-2007), Search Committee for AIChE Journal's Chief-Editor (2000), AIChE Board's Strategy Planning Meeting (2004), AIChE Fellow Review Committee (2006-2008), AIChE Board Award Committee (2008), AIChE International Committee (2008-2009), and Board of Trustees AIChE Foundation (2011). He has been an active member of the AIChE Separations Division and was its chair in 1994. As a chair, he was responsible for the AIChE's 2nd Topical Conference on Separations (1995).

Agrawal has served on the editorial boards of prominent chemical engineering journals: Consulting Editor, Separations, AIChE Journal (1999-2008); Editorial Advisory Board, Industrial & Engineering Chemistry Research (2010-2012); Editorial Board, Current Opinion in Chemical Engineering (2011- 2021); Editorial Advisory Board, Chemical Engineering Progress (2012-2020); Consulting Editors Board, AIChE Journal (2012–present); Editorial Board, Chemie Ingenieur Technik - Chemical Engineering and Technology – Energy Technology (2012-2023); and Editorial Board member, Journal of Advanced Manufacturing and Processing (2018–present).

He has served on the Programming Committees of several national and international conferences. They include the series of Foundations of Computer-Aided Process Design (FOCAPD), Process Systems Engineering (PSE), and Distillation & Absorption conferences.

Agrawal was a trustee of the Computer-aided Chemical Engineering (CACHE) corporation (1997-2005). He was a U.S. Member of Commission A3 (1996-1999), and Commission A2 (2000-2007) of the International Institute of Refrigeration (IIR). He was also Vice President of Commission A2 from 2003 to 2007. His service to National Science Foundation (NSF) includes serving on the Panel on Process Design and Control (2005), the workshop on Separations (2004), and the international benchmarking study on Systems Engineering for Renewable and Clean Energy Manufacturing (SEEM), (2012). He is a guest member of the European Federation of Chemical Engineering (EFCE) Working Party on Fluid Separations (2010–present).

Agrawal served as a Panel Member that studied the Role of Indian Diaspora in Capacity Building for Affordable Solar Power and made a presentation on solar strategy to Indian Prime Minister Narendra Modi, External Affairs Minister Sushma Swaraj, and Energy Minister R. K. Singh in August 2018. He participated in the discussion of the Role of Indian Diaspora in Capacity Building for Affordable Solar Power at the 15th Pravasi Bharatiya Divas (PBD) Convention, Varanasi, India, January 2019. He was a panelist on Sustainable Fuels as well as Advanced Materials sessions at Vaishvik Bhartiya Vaigyanik (VAIBHAV) Summit, in October 2020. He is a member of the Advisory Board of the Department of Sustainable Engineering, IIT Kanpur, India (2021–present).
