= Rodney Bagley =

American engineer and co-inventor of the catalytic converter

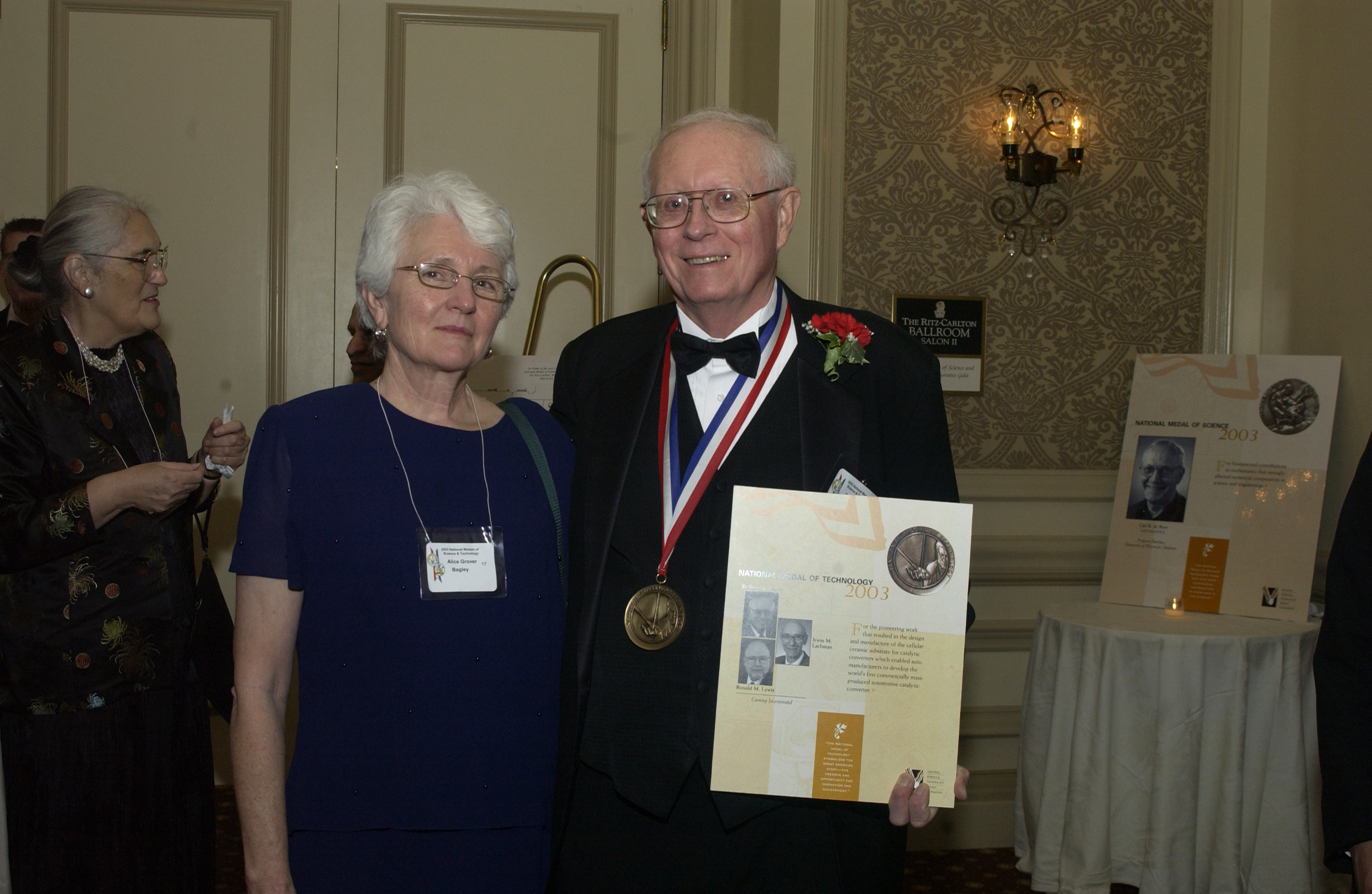
Rodney Bagley with his wife at the award ceremony for the National Medal of Technology and Innovation (2005)

Rodney D. Bagley (October 2, 1934-April 13, 2023) was an engineer and co-inventor of the catalytic converter.

Rodney Bagley was born in Ogden, Utah, on 2 October 1934. He earned a B.S. in geological engineering in 1960, and a PhD in ceramic engineering in 1964, both from the University of Utah. He worked for Corning Incorporated from 1963 until his retirement in 1994, researching unique ceramic materials. Bagley is a Corning Research fellow, an American Ceramic Society fellow, and recipient of the Geijsbeck Award (1985) and the International Ceramics Prize (1996). He was inducted into the National Inventors Hall of Fame in 2002.

The Clean Air Act (1970) set new standards for automotive emissions. Bagley, as part of a Corning team that also included Irwin Lachman and geologist Ronald Lewis, invented the core, or substrate, used in modern catalytic converters. They developed the extrusion die along with a process that made a thin-walled, honeycomb cellular ceramic substrate. Thousands of cellular channels through the structure allowed for a large surface area. The inside surface area was then coated with a catalyst that reacted with pollutants, converting 95% of exhaust pollutants into harmless emissions, including carbon dioxide, nitrogen, and water vapor. A restriction of the ceramic substrate was that due to its sensitivity, only lead-free gasoline could be used. Ceramic substrate technology is now used by every automotive manufacturer in the world and is credited with reducing automotive pollutants by more than three billion tons worldwide.
