= Unburned hydrocarbon =

Unburned hydrocarbons (UHCs) are the hydrocarbons emitted after petroleum is burned in an engine.

When unburned fuel is emitted from a combustor, the emission is caused by fuel "avoiding" the flame zones. For example, in piston engines, some of the fuel-air mixture "hides" from the flame in the crevices provided by the piston ring grooves. Further, some regions of the combustion chamber may have a very weak flame, that is, they have either very fuel-lean or very fuel-rich conditions and consequently they have a low combustion temperature. These regions will cause intermediate species such as formaldehyde and alkenes to be emitted. Sometimes the term "products of incomplete combustion," or PICs, is used to describe such species.

== Formation ==
The hydrocarbon is an auspicious way to reach low NOx (nitrogen oxide) emissions in diesel engines but one of its disadvantages is drastic increasing amount of unburned hydrocarbons. E standard, one is all metal single-cylinder diesel engine and another is an equivalent optically-accessible engine.
