= IEEE Morris N. Liebmann Memorial Award =

Award formerly presented by the IEEE

- Awarded for: "Important contributions to emerging technologies recognized within recent years"
- Presented by: Institute of Radio Engineers (1919–1963); Institute of Electrical and Electronics Engineers (1963–2000)
- Formerly called: Morris Liebmann Memorial Prize
- First award: 1919
- Final award: 2000
- Website: Discontinued IEEE-Level Awards

The initially called Morris Liebmann Memorial Prize provided by the Institute of Radio Engineers (IRE), the IEEE Morris N. Liebmann Memorial Award was created in 1919 in honor of Colonel Morris N. Liebmann. It was initially given to awardees who had "made public during the recent past an important contribution to radio communications." The award continued to be awarded as the IEEE Morris N. Liebmann Memorial Award by the board of directors of the Institute of Electrical and Electronics Engineers (IEEE) after the IRE organization merged into the IEEE in 1963. The scope was changed to "for important contributions to emerging technologies recognized within recent years." After 2000, the award was superseded by the IEEE Daniel E. Noble Award.

== Recipients ==
Year	Recipient		Citation
Year	Image	Name	Citation
1919	L. F. Fuller		"For his contributions to long distance radio communication."
1920		R. A. Weagant	"For his experimental researchers and results in the field of the reduction of atmospheric disturbances in radio reception."
1921		R. A. Heising	"In recognition of the publication of his basic work in the field of the signal modulation of an oscillator out put, and in particular of his invention and development of constant current modulations as first applied to radiotelephony."
1922	C. S. Franklin		"For his investigations of short wave directional transmission and reception."
1923		H. H. Beverage	"For his work on directional antennas."
1924	J. R. Carson		"In recognition of his valuable contributions to alternating current circuit theory and, in particular, to his investigations of filter systems and of single side band telephony."
1925		Frank Conrad	"For his research work in the short wave transmitting and receiving field."
1926	Ralph Bown		"For researches and investigations into the more difficult element of wave transmission phenomena which have resulted in extensive and useful additions to existing knowledge."
1927		A. H. Taylor	"For his work in connection with the investigation of radio transmission phenomena."
1928	W. G. Cady		"For his fundamental investigations in piezo electric phenomena and their application to radio technique."
1929		E. V. Appleton	"For his investigations in the field of wave propagation."
1930		A. W. Hull	"In recognition of the many advances in vacuum tube development which were due to his fundamental researches in the field of electronics."
1931	Stuart Ballantine		"For his outstanding theoretical and experimental investigations of numerous radio and acoustic devices."
1932	Edmond Bruce		"For his theoretical investigations and field developments in the domain of directional antennas."
1933	Heinrich Barkhausen		"For his work on oscillation circuits and particularly on that type of oscillator which now bears his name."
1934		V. K. Zworykin	"For his contributions to the development of television."
1935	F. B. Llewellyn		"For his analysis and disclosures of the effects and reactions within vacuum tubes at ultra high frequencies."
1936	B. J. Thompson		"For his contribution to the vacuum tube art in the field of very high frequencies."
1937	W. H. Doherty		"For his improvement in the efficiency of radio frequency power amplifiers."
1938		G. C. Southworth	"For his theoretical and experimental investigations of the propagation of ultra high frequency waves through confined dielectric channels and the development of a technique for the generation and measurement of such waves."
1939	H. T. Friis		"For his investigations in radio transmission including the development of methods of measuring signals and noise and the creation of a receiving system for mitigating selective fading and noise interference."
1940	H. A. Wheeler		"For his contributions to the analysis of wide band high frequency circuits particularly suitable for television."
1941		P. T. Farnsworth	"For his contributions in the field of applied electronics."
1942	S. A. Schelkunoff		"For his contributions to the theory of electromagnetic fields in wave transmission and radiation."
1943		W. L. Barrow	"For his theoretical and experimental investigations of ultra high frequency propagation in wave guides and radiation from horns, and the application of these principles to engineering practice."
1944	W. W. Hansen		"For his application of electromagnetic theory in radiation antennas, resonators, and electron bunching, and for the development of practical equipment and measurement techniques in the microwave field."
1945	P. C. Goldmark		"For his contributions to the development of television systems, particularly in the field of color."
1946	Albert Rose		"For his contributions to the art of converting optical images to electrical signals, particularly the image orthicon."
1947		J. R. Pierce	"For his development of a traveling wave tube having both high gain and very great bandwidth."
1948	S. W. Seeley		"For his development of ingenious circuits related to frequency modulation."
1949		C. E. Shannon	"For his original and important contributions to the theory of the transmission of information in the presence of noise."
1950	O. H. Schade		"For outstanding contributions to analysis, measurement technique, and system development in the field of television and related optics."
1951	R. B. Dome		"For many technical contributions to the profession, but notably his contributions to the inter carrier sound system of television reception, wide band phase shift networks and various simplifying innovations in FM receiver circuits."
1952		William Shockley	"In recognition of his contributions to the creation and development of the transistor."
1953	J. A. Pierce		"For his pioneering and sustained outstanding contributions to radio navigation, and his related fundamental studies of radio wave propagation."
1954	R. R. Warnecke		"For his many valuable contributions and scientific advancements in the field of electron tubes, and in particular, the magnetron class of traveling wave tubes."
1955	A. V. Loughren		"For his leadership and technical contributions in the formulation of the signal specification for compatible color television."
1956	Kenneth Bullington		"For his contributions to the knowledge of tropospheric transmission beyond the horizon, and to the application of the principles of such transmission to practical communications systems."
1957	O. G. Villard, Jr.		"For his contributions in the field of meteor astronomy and ionosphere physics which led to the solution of outstanding problems in radio propagation."
1958	E. L. Ginzton		"For his creative contribution to the generation and useful application of high energy at micro wave frequencies."
1959		Nicolaas Bloembergen	"For fundamental and original contributions to the maser."
1959		C. H. Townes	"For fundamental and original contributions to the maser."
1960	J. A. Rajchman		"For contributions to the development of magnetic devices for information processing."
1961		Leo Esaki	"For important contributions to the theory and technology of solid state devices, particularly as embodied in the tunnel diode."
1962	Victor H. Rumsey		"For basic contributions to the development of frequent independent antennas."
1963	Ian Munro Ross		"For contributions to the development of the epitaxial transistor and other semiconductor devices."
1964		Arthur L. Schawlow	"For his pioneering and continuing contributions in the field of optical masers."
1965	William R. Bennett, Jr.		No citation
1966	Paul K. Weimer		"For invention, development and applications of the thin-film transistor."
1967	No award		
1968		Emmett N. Leith	"For establishing the place of coherent optics in radar and communications system and for major advances in modern holography."
1969	John B. Gunn		"For contributions to solid state microwave power generation."
1970	John A. Copeland		"For the discovery of the limited space charge accumulation mode of oscillation."
1971		Martin Ryle	"For his contributions in applying aperture synthesis to extend the capabilities of radio telescopes, thereby increasing man's knowledge of the Universe."
1972	Stewart E. Miller		"For pioneering research in guided millimeter wave and optical transmission systems."
1973		Nick Holonyak, Jr.	"For outstanding contributions to the field of visible light emitting diodes and diode lasers."
1974		Willard S. Boyle	"For the invention of the charge-coupled device and leadership in the field of MOS device physics."
1974		George E. Smith	"For the invention of the charge-coupled device and leadership in the field of MOS device physics."
1975	A. H. Bobeck		"For the concept and development of single-walled magnetic domains (magnetic bubbles), and for recognition of their importance to memory technology."
1975	P. C. Michaelis		"For the concept and development of single-walled magnetic domains (magnetic bubbles), and for recognition of their importance to memory technology."
1975	H. E. D. Scovil		"For the concept and development of single-walled magnetic domains (magnetic bubbles), and for recognition of their importance to memory technology."
1976	Herbert John Shaw		"For contributions to the development of acoustics surface wave devices."
1977	Horst H. Berger		"For the invention and exploration of the Merged Transistor Logic, MTL."
1977	Siegfried K. Wiedmann		"For the invention and exploration of the Merged Transistor Logic, MTL."
1978		Kuen C. Kao	"For making communication at optical frequencies practical by discovering, inventing and developing the materials, techniques and configurations for glass fiber waveguides."
1978	John B. MacChesney		"For making communication at optical frequencies practical by discovering, inventing and developing the materials, techniques and configurations for glass fiber waveguides."
1978	Robert D. Maurer		"For making communication at optical frequencies practical by discovering, inventing and developing the materials, techniques and configurations for glass fiber waveguides."
1979	Ping King Tien		"For contributions to integrated optics technology."
1980	Anthony J. DeMaria		"For contributions to the initiation and demonstration of the first picosecond optical pulse generator."
1981	Calvin F. Quate		"For development of an acoustic microscope capable of sub-micron resolution."
1982	John Arthur, Jr.		"For the development and application of molecular beam epitaxy technology."
1982	Alfred Y. Cho		"For the development and application of molecular beam epitaxy technology."
1983	Robert W. Brodersen		"For pioneering contributions and leadership in research on switched-capacitor circuits for analog-digital conversion and filtering."
1983	Paul R. Gray		"For pioneering contributions and leadership in research on switched-capacitor circuits for analog-digital conversion and filtering."
1983	David A. Hodges		"For pioneering contributions and leadership in research on switched-capacitor circuits for analog-digital conversion and filtering."
1984	David E. Carlson		"For crucial contributions to the use of amorphous silicon in low-cost, high-performance photovoltaic solar cells."
1984	Christopher R. Wronski		"For crucial contributions to the use of amorphous silicon in low-cost, high-performance photovoltaic solar cells."
1985		Russell D. Dupuis	"For pioneering work in metalorganic chemical vapor deposition, epitaxial-crystal reactor design, and demonstration of superior quality semiconductor devices grown by this process."
1985	Harold M. Manasevit		"For pioneering work in metalorganic chemical vapor deposition, epitaxial-crystal reactor design, and demonstration of superior quality semiconductor devices grown by this process."
1986	Bishnu S. Atal		"For pioneering contributions to linear predictive coding for speech processing."
1986	Fumitada Itakura		"For pioneering contributions to linear predictive coding for speech processing."
1987	No award		
1988	James R. Boddie		"For contributions to the realization of practical single chip digital signal processors."
1988	Richard A. Pedersen		"For contributions to the realization of practical single chip digital signal processors."
1989	Takanori Okoshi		"For leadership in and pioneering contributions to coherent optical fiber communications."
1990	Satoshi Hiyamizu		"For demonstration of the High Electron Mobility Transistor (HEMT)."
1990	Takashi Mimura		"For demonstration of the High Electron Mobility Transistor (HEMT)."
1991	Morton B. Panish		"For outstanding contributions to the epitaxial growth of compound semiconductor materials and devices."
1992	Praveen Chaudhari		"For the discovery of amorphous magnetic films used in magneto-optic data storage systems."
1992	Jerome J. Cuomo		"For the discovery of amorphous magnetic films used in magneto-optic data storage systems."
1992	Richard J. Gambino		"For the discovery of amorphous magnetic films used in magneto-optic data storage systems."
1993		B. Jayant Baliga	"For pioneering contributions to the development of advanced power semiconductor devices."
1994		Lubomyr T. Romankiw	"For innovations in thin film fabrication processes to realize inductive and magnetoresistive thin-film heads for large scale storage."
1995	M. George Craford		"For contributions and leadership in the research, development, and manufacturing of visible-spectrum LED materials and devices."
1996	Seiki Ogura		"For contributions to and leadership in the development of the lightly doped drain silicon field effect transistor (LDDFET)."
1997		Fujio Masuoka	"For the development of Flash EEPROM and NAND-type EEPROM technology."
1998	Naoki Yokoyama		"For contributions to and leadership in the development of self-aligned refractory-gate gallium arsenide MESFET integrated circuits."
1999	No award		
2000		James S. Harris, Jr.	"For contributions to technology enabling commercialization of gallium arsenide devices and circuits."
