= Daniel E. Noble =

American engineer

- Born: October 4, 1901; Naugatuck, Connecticut
- Died: February 16, 1980 (aged 78)
- Citizenship: United States
- Awards: Stuart Ballantine Medal (1972); IEEE Edison Medal (1978)
- Scientific career
- Institutions: Motorola

Daniel Earl Noble (October 4, 1901 – February 16, 1980) was an American engineer, and executive vice chairman of the board of Motorola, who is known for the design and installation of the nation's first statewide two-way FM radio communications system for the Connecticut State Police.

He received a BS degree in engineering from the University of Connecticut.

He joined Motorola as director of research in 1940. His Link SCR-300 backpack transmitter and receiver, which he had reduced to about forty pounds, provided the first practical FM band transmission for military use. Introduced in 1943, and first used at the Battle of Anzio, the portable FM field radio allowed communication with less interference than the AM "walkie-talkie" systems that had been used earlier in World War II.

In 1949 he set up a solid state electronics research laboratory for Motorola in Phoenix, Arizona, which ultimately became the headquarters of the Semiconductor Products Sector of Motorola, and ultimately Freescale Semiconductor as it separated from Motorola.

The IEEE Daniel E. Noble Award (previously named the IEEE Morris N. Liebmann Memorial Award) was established by the IEEE in 2000 for outstanding contributions to emerging technologies recognized within recent years.

== Honors and awards ==
- IEEE Edison Medal in 1978
- member, National Academy of Engineering
- Fellow, IEEE
- Fellow, Franklin Institute
- Stuart Ballantine Medal in 1972

== US patents ==
- U.S. patent 2,597,517, 1952
- U.S. patent 2,547,025, 1951
- U.S. patent 2,547,024, 1951
- U.S. patent 2,539,268, 1950
- U.S. patent 2,500,372, 1949
- U.S. patent 2,459,675, 1948
- U.S. patent 2,343,115, 1944
- U.S. patent 2,090,224, 1937
