= Richard J. Gambino =

American material scientist (1935–2014)

Richard J. Gambino (May 17, 1935 – August 3, 2014) was an American material scientist best known for his pioneering work with amorphous magnetic materials.

== Life and career ==
Gambino received his BA in 1957 from the University of Connecticut, and MS in 1976 from the Polytechnic Institute of New York University. He served from 1956 to 1960 as a Physics Scientist at the US Army Signal Corps Research Lab, a metallurgist from 1960 to 1961 at Pratt & Whitney, and from 1961 to 1993 as a member of the research staff at IBM Yorktown. In 1993 he became a professor at Stony Brook University.

In 1992, Gambino received the IEEE Morris N. Liebmann Memorial Award together with Praveen Chaudhari and Jerome J. Cuomo, "for the discovery of amorphous magnetic films used in magneto-optic data storage systems". He received the National Medal of Technology in 1995 for the development of amorphous magnetic materials used for magneto-optic disk media.

Gambino was also elected a member of the National Academy of Engineering in 2004 for the discovery of magnetic anisotropy, the enabling technology of magneto-optical recording.

Gambino was also an IEEE Fellow and holds 40 patents. He died on August 3, 2014, at the age of 79.

== Sources ==
- Biography, SUNY Stonybrook
- IEEE Morris N. Liebmann Memorial Award recipients
