= Bullington =

Bullington may refer to:

- Bullington, Hampshire
- Bullington, Lincolnshire
- Bullington, Ontario

People

- Bryan Bullington (born 1980), American baseball pitcher
- James R. Bullington (born 1940), American ambassador
- Jesse Bullington, American fantasy writer
- Kenneth Bullington (1913-1984), American electrical engineer
- Orville Bullington (1882-1956), American lawyer, businessman and politician
- Wally Bullington, American football player
