= Herbert Shaw =

Herbert Shaw may refer to:

- Herbert H. Shaw (born 1930), perennial New Jersey political candidate
- Herbert John Shaw (1918–2006), professor of electrical engineering
- Herbert Kenneth Airy Shaw (1902–1985), English botanist and classicist
