= Boddie =

Boddie is a surname. Notable people with the surname include:

- James R. Boddie, American electrical engineer
- Nick Boddie Williams (1906–1992), American journalist and novelist
- Tony Boddie (born 1960), American football player
- Van Buren Boddie (1869–1928), American politician from Mississippi
- Whitney Boddie (born 1987), American basketball player
