= Valdemar Poulsen Gold Medal =

The Valdemar Poulsen Gold Medal
- Awarded for: Outstanding research in the field of radio techniques and related fields
- Country: Denmark
- Presented by: Danish Academy of Technical Sciences
- First award: 1939
- Final award: 1993
- Website: http://www.atv.dk

The Valdemar Poulsen Gold Medal, named after radio pioneer Valdemar Poulsen, was awarded each year for outstanding research in the field of radio techniques and related fields by the Danish Academy of Technical Sciences. The award was presented on November 23, the anniversary of Poulsen's birth. The award was discontinued in 1993.

== Recipients ==
- 1939 Valdemar Poulsen
- 1946 Robert Watson-Watt
- 1947 Ernst Alexanderson
- 1948 Edward Victor Appleton
- 1953 Balthasar van der Pol
- 1956 Harald T. Friis
- 1958 Hidetsugu Yagi
- 1960 Charles P. Ginsburg
- 1963 John R. Pierce
- 1969 Jay Wright Forrester
- 1973 J. B. Gunn
- 1976 Andrew Bobeck
