= Luc Thévenaz =

Swiss physicist who specializes in fibre optics

Professor Luc Thévenaz
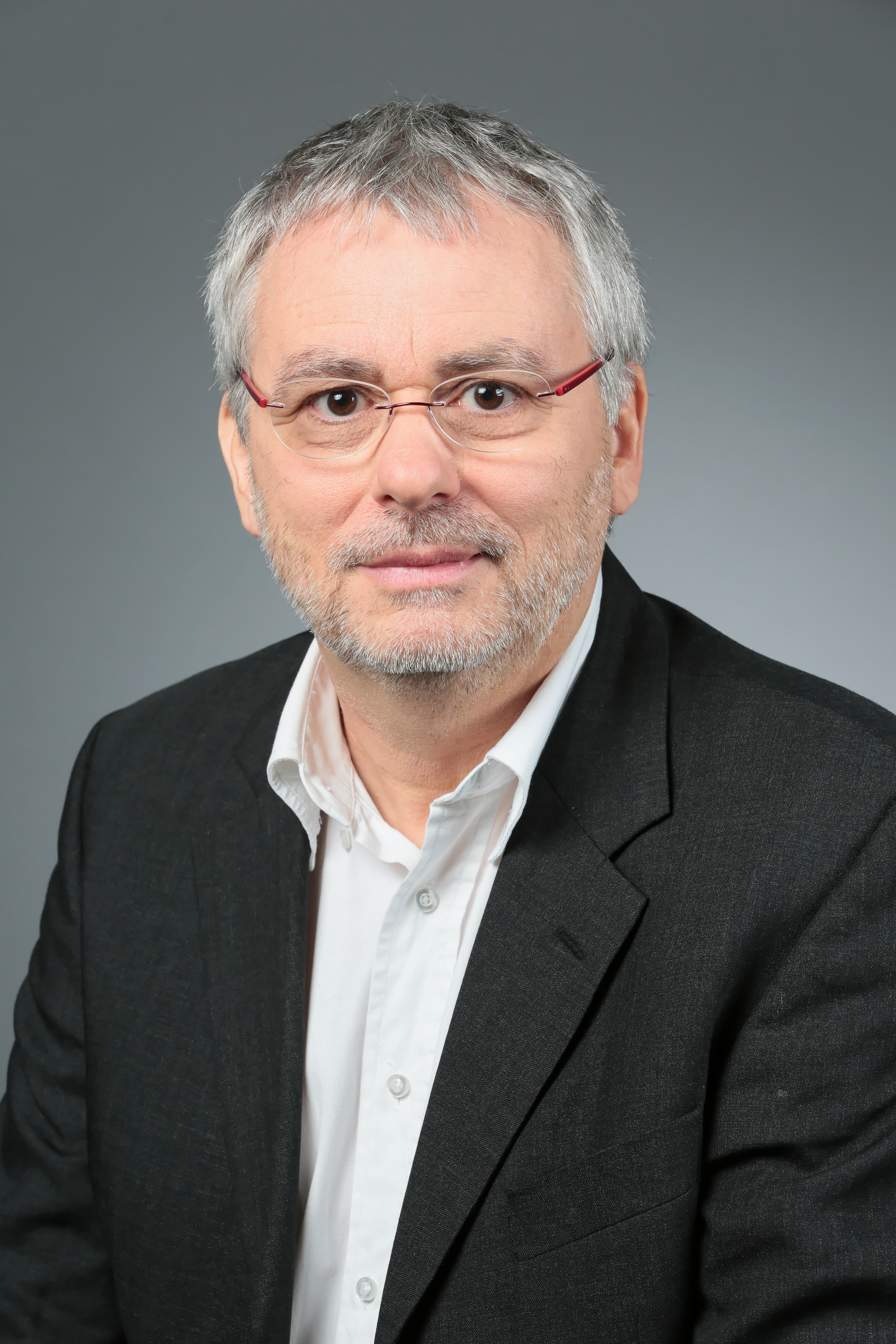
- Luc Thévenaz in 2016
- Born: 1958 (age 67–68); Geneva
- Known for: Brillouin scattering in optical fibres

Academic background
- Education: Physics
- Alma mater: University of Geneva; Geneva Observatory
- Thesis: Effets et mesure de la dispersion dans les guides d'ondes optiques (1988)
- Doctoral advisor: Olivier Guisan; Jean-Paul Pellaux
- Other advisors: Philippe Robert; Herbert John Shaw

Academic work
- Institutions: EPFL (École Polytechnique Fédérale de Lausanne)
- Main interests: Fibre optics Nonlinear fibre optics Optical fibre sensing Atimulated Brillouin scattering Distributed fibre sensing Optical signal processing Slow & fast light Photoacoustic spectroscopy
- Website: https://gfo.epfl.ch

Luc Thévenaz (born 1958 in Geneva) is a Swiss physicist who specializes in fibre optics. He is a professor of physics at EPFL (École Polytechnique Fédérale de Lausanne) and the head of the Group for Fibre Optics School of Engineering.

== Career ==
Thévenaz studied a Master's degree in physics at University of Geneva and in 1982 wrote his thesis in astrophysics at the Geneva Observatory under the supervision of André Maeder, in which he developed a model to predict the effect of stellar wind on the apparent radius and temperature of stars. He then joined Jean-Paul Pellaux at University of Geneva as PhD student, and graduated in 1988 with a thesis on measurement of chromatic dispersion in optical fibres. During this time, he designed a technique to make accurate time delay measurements with picosecond resolution using a halogen lamp light source. As a postdoctoral researcher he joined Philippe Robert at EPFL's Institute of Electrical Engineering in 1988, to conduct research on polarization mode dispersion and brfringence measurements in optical fibres. In 1991, he visited visiting postdoctoral researcher both PUC University in Rio de Janeiro to develop fast pulse detector using semiconductor laser dynamics, and the Ginzton Lab in the group of Herbert John Shaw at Stanford University to do research on optical gyroscopes using stimulated Brillouin scattering lasers in optical fibres.

In 1992, he became a research associate EPFL's Institute of Electrical Engineering, and continued his research on stimulated Brillouin scattering in optical fibres and applied it to distributed fibre sensors. As visiting scientist he joined in 1998 KAIST (Korean Advanced Institute of Science and Technology) to work on Brillouin fibre lasers. In 1998, he was made senior lecturer at EPFL, and started working on advanced measurement techniques and signal processing in optical fibres, and on gas traces detection using laser spectroscopy and photo-acoustic detection. By using stimulated Brillouin scattering, he was able to demonstrate the generation of slow and fast light in optical fibres.

Since 2007 he has been visiting professor at Shanghai Jiao Tong University, Tel Aviv University, University of Sydney, and the Technical University of Valencia.

Since 2008 Thévenaz has been adjunct professor at EPFL's Institute of Electrical Engineering and head of the Group of Fibre Optics.

== Research ==
Thévenaz's research is focused on distributed fibre sensing and on slow & fast light.

Among his key findings figure novel techniques to achieve centimetric spatial resolutions and increase the number of resolved points up to 1 million in distributed fibre sensing; the development on coding techniques and contributions to the determination of fundamental limits; the application of spider silk optical fibre in chemical sensing; and the achievement of massive optical amplification in hollow core fibres using stimulated Brillouin scattering in gases.

Thévenaz's research was featured in several news outlet such as: Optics, ScienceDaily, Le Nouvelliste, 24 heures, and RTS.

== Distinctions ==
Among others Thévenaz is a fellow of the Optical Society of America (since 2010), and the IEEE (since 2017). He has been a co-executive editor-in-chief of the journal Nature Light (since 2018) and an editorial advisory board member of the Journal APL Photonics.

He was a coordinator of the Marie-Curie Innovative Training Network "FINESSE – Fibre Nervous Sensing Systems" (2016–2020).

He is a member of the SwissPhotonics (since 2013), and the SPIE (since 2015).

He is the co-founder of the spin-off company Omnisens producing long-distance distributed fibre sensing systems for oil and gas, power and civil engineering infrastructures.

== Selected works ==
- Thevenaz, L.; Pellaux, J.-P. (1988). "Group delay measurement in single-mode fibers with true picosecond resolution using double optical modulation". Journal of Lightwave Technology. 6 (10): 1470–1475. Bibcode:1988JLwT....6.1470T. doi:10.1109/50.7903.
- Nikles, M.; Thevenaz, L.; Robert, P.A. (1997). "Brillouin gain spectrum characterization in single-mode optical fibers". Journal of Lightwave Technology. 15 (10): 1842–1851. Bibcode:1997JLwT...15.1842N. doi:10.1109/50.633570.
- Niklès, Marc; Thévenaz, Luc; Robert, Philippe A. (1996). "Simple distributed fiber sensor based on Brillouin gain spectrum analysis" (PDF). Optics Letters. 21 (10): 758. Bibcode:1996OptL...21..758N. doi:10.1364/OL.21.000758. PMID 19876149.
- Soto, Marcelo A.; Thévenaz, Luc (2013). "Modeling and evaluating the performance of Brillouin distributed optical fiber sensors". Optics Express. 21 (25): 31347–66. Bibcode:2013OExpr..2131347S. doi:10.1364/OE.21.031347. PMID 24514710.
- González Herráez, Miguel; Thévenaz, Luc; Robert, Philippe (2003). "Distributed measurement of chromatic dispersion by four-wave mixing and Brillouin optical-time-domain analysis" (PDF). Optics Letters. 28 (22): 2210–2. Bibcode:2003OptL...28.2210G. doi:10.1364/OL.28.002210. PMID 14649944.
- Schilt, Stéphane; Thévenaz, Luc; Robert, Philippe (2003). "Wavelength Modulation Spectroscopy: Combined Frequency and Intensity Laser Modulation". Applied Optics. 42 (33): 6728–38. Bibcode:2003ApOpt..42.6728S. doi:10.1364/AO.42.006728. PMID 14658477.
- Song, Kwang Yong; Herráez, Miguel González; Thévenaz, Luc (2005). "Observation of pulse delaying and advancement in optical fibers using stimulated Brillouin scattering". Optics Express. 13 (1): 82–8. Bibcode:2005OExpr..13...82S. doi:10.1364/OPEX.13.000082. PMID 19488330.
- Thévenaz, Luc (2008). "Slow and fast light in optical fibres". Nature Photonics. 2 (8): 474–481. Bibcode:2008NaPho...2..474T. doi:10.1038/nphoton.2008.147.
