= Stuart Ballantine Medal =

The Stuart Ballantine Medal was a science and engineering award presented by the Franklin Institute, of Philadelphia, Pennsylvania, USA. It was named after the US inventor Stuart Ballantine.

== Laureates ==
- 1947 - George Clark Southworth (Physics)
- 1948 - Ray Davis Kell (Engineering)
- 1949 - Sergei A. Schelkunoff (Physics)
- 1952 - John Bardeen (Physics)
- 1952 - Walter H. Brattain (Physics)
- 1953 - David G. C. Luck (Engineering)
- 1954 - Kenneth Alva Norton (Engineering)
- 1955 - Claude Elwood Shannon (Computer and Cognitive Science)
- 1956 - Kenneth Bullington (Physics)
- 1957 - Robert Morris Page (Engineering)
- 1957 - Leo Clifford Young (Engineering)
- 1958 - Harald Trap Friis (Engineering)
- 1959 - Albert Hoyt Taylor (Engineering)
- 1959 - Charles H. Townes (Physics)
- 1960 - Rudolf Kompfner (Engineering)
- 1960 - Harry Nyquist (Engineering)
- 1960 - John R. Pierce (Engineering)
- 1961 - Leo Esaki (Engineering)
- 1961 - Nicolaas Bloembergen (Physics)
- 1961 - H. E. Derrick Scovill (Physics)
- 1962 - Ali Javan (Physics)
- 1962 - Theodore H. Maiman (Physics)
- 1962 - Arthur L. Schawlow (Physics)
- 1962 - Charles H. Townes (Physics)
- 1963 - Arthur C. Clarke (Engineering)
- 1965 - Homer Walter Dudley (Engineering)
- 1965 - Alec Harley Reeves (Engineering)
- 1966 - Robert N. Noyce (Computer and Cognitive Science)
- 1966 - Jack S. Kilby (Engineering)
- 1967 - Jack N. James (Engineering)
- 1967 - Robert J. Parks (Engineering)
- 1968 - Chandra Kumar Naranbhai Patel (Physics)
- 1969 - Emmett N. Leith (Physics)
- 1971 - Zhores I. Alferov (Physics)
- 1972 - Daniel Earl Noble (Engineering)
- 1973 - Andrew H. Bobeck (Computer and Cognitive Science)
- 1973 - Willard S. Boyle (Computer and Cognitive Science)
- 1973 - George E. Smith (Computer and Cognitive Science)
- 1975 - Bernard C. De Loach, Jr. (Engineering)
- 1975 - Martin Mohamed Atalla (Physics)
- 1975 - Dawon Kahng (Physics)
- 1977 - Charles Kuen Kao (Engineering)
- 1977 - Stewart E. Miller (Engineering)
- 1979 - Marcian E. Hoff, Jr. (Computer and Cognitive Science)
- 1979 - Benjamin Abeles (Engineering)
- 1979 - George D. Cody (Engineering)
- 1981 - Amos E. Joel, Jr. (Engineering)
- 1983 - Adam Lender (Computer and Cognitive Science)
- 1986 - Linn F. Mollenauer (Engineering)
- 1989 - John M. J. Madey (Physics)
- 1992 - Rolf Landauer (Physics)
- 1993 - Leroy L. Chang (Physics)

== Sources ==
- The Franklin Institute. Winners. Ballantine Medal winners (bad link).
- The Franklin Institute. Laureates Search, Ballantine Award
