= Robert Dome =

Robert Dome may refer to:

- Róbert Döme (born 1979), Slovak ice hockey player
- Robert B. Dome (1905–1996), American electrical engineer
