= Henry Evelyn Derek Scovil =

Henry Evelyn Derrick Scovil (1923–2010) was a physicist noted for his contributions to masers and bubble memory.

Scovil received his D. Phil. in 1951 from University of Oxford for his thesis "Investigation of Paramagnetic Substances at Centimetre Wave-Lengths", studied paramagnetic resonance at Clarendon Laboratory, then moved to Bell Labs where he, George Feher, and H. Seidel built the first tunable, solid state maser. In the late 1950s he and colleagues constructed ruby travelling wave masers, cooled to 4.2K by liquid helium, which were then the world's lowest-noise microwave amplifiers. They were used by Arno Penzias and Robert Woodrow Wilson in their investigations of the cosmic microwave background.

Scovil was awarded the Franklin Institute's 1972 Stuart Ballantine Medal and the 1975 IEEE Morris N. Liebmann Memorial Award "for the concept and development of single-walled magnetic domains (magnetic bubbles), and for recognition of their importance to memory technology". He is a member of the National Academy of Engineering.

Scovil was born in 1923 in Victoria, British Columbia, Canada and received his Master's degree in physics from the University of British Columbia, where he later briefly taught. He died May 11, 2010, in Port Townsend, Washington, United States. He was predeceased by his wife, Gwendolyn, and survived by his son, Alistair (married to the writer Adrianne Harun) and two grandsons, Peter Angus Scovil and Duncan Christopher Henry Scovil.

== Selected works ==
- Scovil, H. E. D.; Stevens, K. W. H. (1952-11-01). "The 'Extra' Levels in Rare Earth Salts". Proceedings of the Physical Society. Section A. 65 (11). IOP Publishing: 954–955. doi:10.1088/0370-1298/65/11/116. ISSN 0370-1298.
- Bleaney, B.; Scovil, H. E. D.; Trenam, R. S. (1954-04-07). "The paramagnetic resonance spectra of gadolinium and neodymium ethyl sulphates". Proceedings of the Royal Society of London. Series A. Mathematical and Physical Sciences. 223 (1152). The Royal Society: 15–29. Bibcode:1954RSPSA.223...15B. doi:10.1098/rspa.1954.0097. ISSN 0080-4630. S2CID 97471848.
- Scovil, H. E. D.; Feher, G.; Seidel, H. (1957-01-15). "Operation of a Solid State Maser". Physical Review. 105 (2). American Physical Society (APS): 762–763. Bibcode:1957PhRv..105..762S. doi:10.1103/physrev.105.762. ISSN 0031-899X.
- Geusic, J. E.; Scovil, H. E. D. (1964-01-01). "Microwave and optical masers". Reports on Progress in Physics. 27 (1). IOP Publishing: 241–327. Bibcode:1964RPPh...27..241G. doi:10.1088/0034-4885/27/1/306. ISSN 0034-4885.
- Andrew H. Bobeck and H. E. D. Scovil, "Magnetic Bubbles", Scientific American, Vol. 224, No. 6, pages 78–91, June 1971.
