= Naoki Yokoyama =

Japanese electrical engineer

- Born: March 28, 1949 (age 77); Osaka, Japan
- Education: Osaka City University
- Occupation: Electrical engineer

Naoki Yokoyama (横山 直樹, Yokoyama Naoki) (March 28, 1949) is a Japanese electrical engineer, active in the fields of nanotechnology and electronic and photonic devices, best known for his success in fabricating hot-electron transistors and invention of resonant-tunneling transistors.

Yokoyama born in Osaka, Japan, received his bachelor's degree in Physics from Osaka City University (1971), and master's (1973) and PhD (1984) degrees in Engineering from the Graduate School of Engineering Science at Osaka University. He joined the Semiconductor Devices Laboratory of Fujitsu Laboratories Ltd. in 1973, where he was subsequently named a Fellow and General Manager of its Nanotechnology Research Center in 2000. He is also Visiting Professor of the University of Tokyo.

Yokoyama received the 1987 GaAs Symposium Young Scientist Award, and 1998 IEEE Morris N. Liebmann Memorial Award "for contributions to and leadership in the development of self-aligned refractory-gate gallium arsenide MESFET integrated circuits." He was elected an IEEE Fellow in 2000, Fellow of the Institute of Electronics, Information and Communication Engineers in 2003, and Fellow of the Applied Physics Society in 2007.

== Selected works ==
- Masayuki Abe, Naoki Yokoyama, Semiconductor heterostructure devices, Volume 8 of Japanese technology reviews, Taylor & Francis US, 1989. ISBN 978-2-88124-338-7.
