= Stuart Ballantine =

Charles Stuart Ballantine (September 22, 1897 – May 7, 1944) was an American electronic engineer and inventor.

Ballantine was born in the Germantown section of Philadelphia, Pennsylvania. He was an amateur radio enthusiast by 1908 and served as a ship radio operator during the summers of 1913-1915. He was employed in 1916 by H. K. Mulford Company, biochemists, and in 1917 by the Bell Telephone Company of Pennsylvania.

From 1917 to 1920 Ballantine attended Drexel Institute and worked as a radio expert at the Philadelphia Naval Shipyard, where he led design of the Navy coil-type radio compasses. He discovered the "antenna effect" in such systems and invented the capacity compensator for its control. In 1920-1921 he undertook graduate studies in mathematical physics at Harvard University, then spent a year at the Radio Frequency Laboratories in Boonton, New Jersey, where he worked on radio receivers and made inventions for stabilization of radio-frequency amplifiers via a Wheatstone bridge, linear detection at high signal levels, and automatic volume control. He returned to Harvard 1923-1924 as a John Tyndall scholar in physics.

From 1924 to 1927 Ballantine carried out independent studies of radio propagation in White Haven, Pennsylvania, then was briefly research director at the Radio Frequency Laboratories, and in 1929 collaborated with F. M. Huntoon in studying the effects of high pressure on bacteria. From 1929 to 1934 he was President of the Boonton Research Laboratories investigating errors in microphones due to diffraction and cavity resonance, and developing new devices including an electrostethoscope, automatic optical recorder for frequency-response measurements, and logarithmic voltmeter. In 1934 he founded Ballantine Laboratories, which he led until his death. There he developed improved techniques for measuring the performance of microphones and loudspeakers, and most notably, the first throat microphone for aircraft pilots.

Ballantine held more than 30 patents, and was a Fellow of the American Physical Society, the Acoustical Society of America, and the Institute of Radio Engineers, as well as a member of the American Association for the Advancement of Science and the Franklin Institute. He received the 1931 IEEE Morris N. Liebmann Memorial Award, the 1934 Elliott Cresson Medal of the Franklin Institute, and the Radio Club of America's 1946 Armstrong Medal (posthumously). The Franklin Institute's Stuart Ballantine Medal is named in his honor. Ballantine was president of the Institute of Radio Engineers in 1935.

== Selected works ==
- Radio Telephony for Amateurs, 1922
