= Satoshi Hiyamizu =

Japanese electrical engineer (1943–2019)

Satoshi Hiyamizu (冷水 佐壽, Hiyamizu Satoshi; 25 February 1943 - 7 February 2019) was a Japanese professor of electrical engineering.

Dr. Hiyamizu won the 1982 Japanese Journal of Applied Physics Paper Award as lead author of a paper on mobility in two-dimensional electron gases while at Fujitsu Laboratories Limited, received the 1990 IEEE Morris N. Liebmann Memorial Award with Takashi Mimura "for outstanding contributions to the epitaxial growth of compound semiconductor materials and devices," and in 2001 was named an IEEE Fellow "for contributions to the realization of the first high electron mobility transistor (HEMT)". He served as dean of the Osaka University Graduate School of Engineering from 2000 to 2002. He died in February 2019 at the age of 75.
