= Arthur V. Loughren =

American electrical engineer

Arthur V. Loughren (September 15, 1902 – December 14, 1993) was an American electrical engineer who played a prominent role in the development of NTSC television.

Loughren was born in Rensselaer, New York, and received his BA (1923) and EE (1925) degrees from Columbia University. He then worked at General Electric in its vacuum tube engineering department 1925–1927; radio engineering department 1927–1929; RCA engineering department 1930–1934; and radio receiver engineering section 1934–1936. In 1936 he joined Hazeltine Corporation, during World War II helped develop IFF equipment for the US Navy, and afterwards directed its research on color television. He died at his home in Kailua-Kona, Hawaii.

Loughren was a fellow of the Institute of Radio Engineers, the American Institute of Electrical Engineers, and the Society of Motion Picture and Television Engineers. He received the 1953 SMPTE David Sarnoff Medal Award "for his contributions to the development of compatible color television, including his active work on the principle of constant luminance; for his participation in color video standards activities; and for his guidance in compatible color television", and the 1955 IEEE Morris N. Liebmann Memorial Award "for his leadership and technical contributions in the formulation of the signal specification for compatible color television". Loughren was president of the Institute of Radio Engineers in 1956.
