= Friis formula =

There are two formulas or equations named after Danish-American radio engineer Harald T. Friis

- Friis formulas for noise
- Friis transmission equation
