= Paul Jaffe =

American electrical engineer

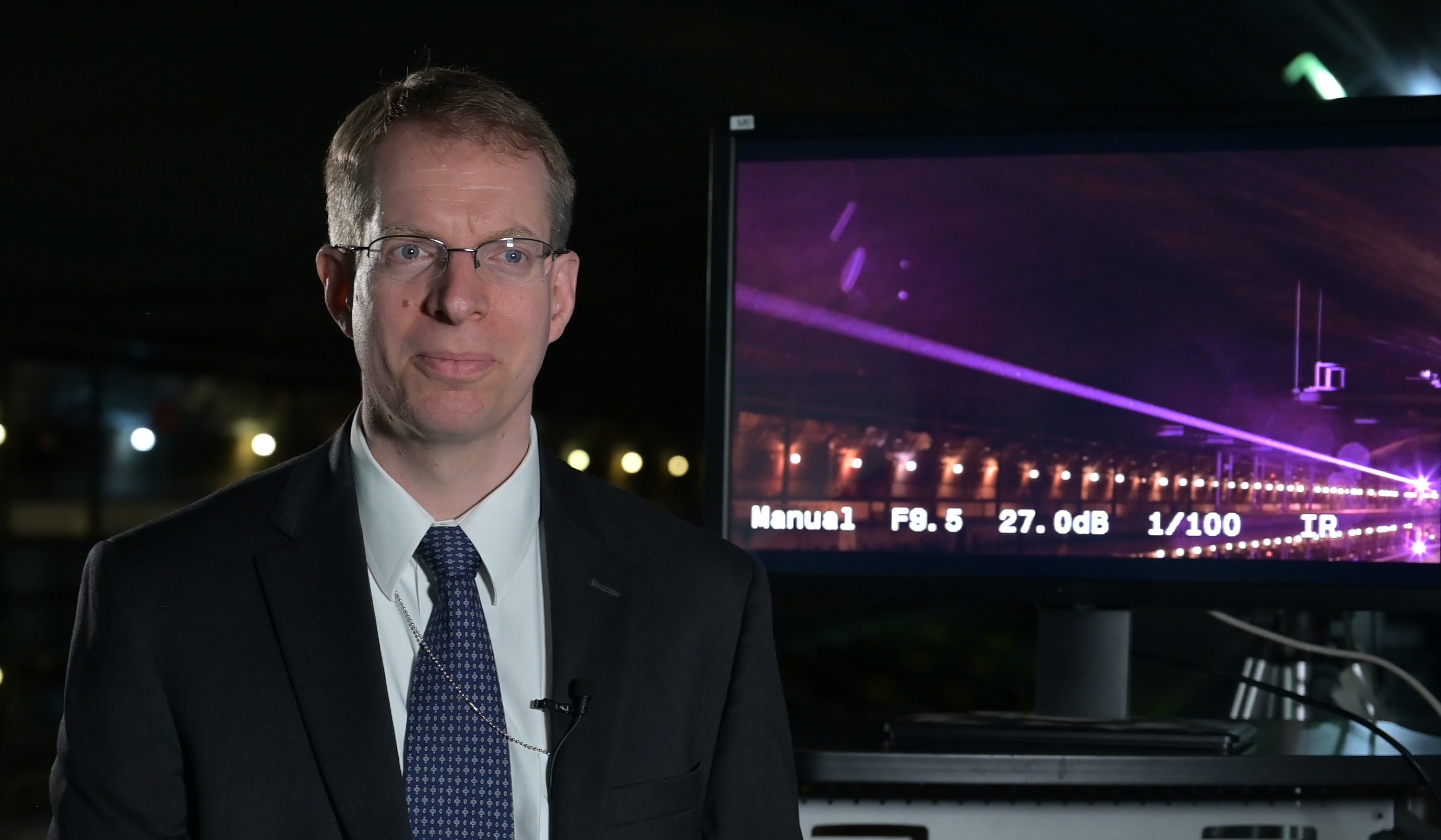
- Paul Jaffe
- Born: 1973 (age 52–53); United States
- Education: University of Maryland, College Park BSEE; Johns Hopkins University, MSEE; University of Maryland, College Park, PhD
- Scientific career
- Fields: electrical engineer, spacecraft engineer, power beaming, space solar
- Thesis: A Sunlight to Microwave Power Transmission Module Prototype for Space Solar Power (2013)

Paul Jaffe (born 1973) is an American electrical engineer who worked in the Spacecraft Engineering Department, United States Naval Research Laboratory. He is known for research on power beaming and space-based solar power. His Ph.D. Thesis (2013) was "A Sunlight to Microwave Power Transmission Module Prototype for Space Solar Power." He was a Program Manager in DARPA's Tactical Technology Office. As of 2026, he is the Vice of President of Systems Engineering at Overview Energy.

One of his specialties is building and testing space modules.

In March 2016 Jaffe and team member Col. Peter Garretson (USAF) won award categories during the first Department of Defense ‘Diplomacy, Development, and Defense (D3) Innovation Challenge.

He is the principal investigator for a space experiment that was launched into space in May 2020, and which provided data to inform the development of solar power satellite technology. He is also the principal investigator of the Space Wireless Energy Laser Link (SWELL), the first experiment to demonstrate laser power beaming in space.

Jaffe oversaw the execution of a DARPA demonstration in 2025 that set a new power beaming distance record of 8.6 km, delivering more than 800 W from a laser transmitter to a photovoltaic receiver.

== Power Beaming: History, Theory, and Practice ==
Jaffe is the lead author of a 2024 book, Power Beaming: History, Theory, and Practice, a textbook covering various methods of power beaming, including both RF (microwave) and optical (laser) technologies.
