= Andrew H. Bobeck =

- Born: October 1, 1926; Tower Hill, Pennsylvania
- Died: December 14, 2017 (aged 91)
- Education: Purdue University
- Occupation: Researcher
- Employer: Bell Laboratories
- Known for: Invention of bubble memory

Andrew H. Bobeck (October 1, 1926 – December 14, 2017) was a Bell Labs researcher best known for his invention of bubble memory.

Bobeck was born in Tower Hill, Pennsylvania.

In 1975, Bobeck was elected a member of the National Academy of Engineering for his contributions to the field of magnetic bubbles that have produced a new class of electronic devices.

== Education ==
In 1948, Bobeck earned a Bachelor of Science degree in EE from Purdue University. In 1949, Bobeck earned a Master of Science degree in EE from Purdue University.

== Career ==
Bobeck was a member of United States Navy's V12 Program.

In 1949, Bobeck joined Bell Laboratories. Bobeck helped design communication and pulse transformers and then one of the first solid-state digital computers. Starting in 1956 he devoted his efforts to the development of magnetic logic and memory devices. He invented the twistor memory in the late 1950s, and in the late 1960s bubble memory based on magnetic domains in orthoferrites and garnets. In 1989 he retired from AT&T's Bell Labs.

Bobeck held more than 120 patents, and was a member of the National Academy of Engineering and an IEEE Fellow. He received an honorary Doctor of Engineering degree from Purdue in 1972, the 1975 IEEE Morris N. Liebmann Memorial Award, and the 1987 IEEE Magnetics Society Achievement Award. He was also presented with the Stuart Ballantine Medal for Computer Sciences by The Franklin Institute in 1973.

== Selected works ==
- Bobeck, Andrew H. (1958). "New Concept in Large‐Size Memory Arrays—the Twistor". Journal of Applied Physics. 29 (3). AIP Publishing: 485–486. Bibcode:1958JAP....29..485B. doi:10.1063/1.1723190. ISSN 0021-8979.
- "New twist in memory devices", Science, Volume 127, Number 3293, 7 February 1958.
- Bobeck, A.H.; Bonyhard, P.I.; Geusic, J.E. (1975). "Magnetic bubbles—An emerging new memory technology". Proceedings of the IEEE. 63 (8). Institute of Electrical and Electronics Engineers (IEEE): 1176–1195. doi:10.1109/proc.1975.9912. ISSN 0018-9219. S2CID 25196430.
- Andrew H. Bobeck and H. E. D. Scovil, "Magnetic Bubbles", Scientific American 78, 224, (June 1971).
- Short 1979 Western promotional film featuring Bobeck

== Awards ==
- IEEE Magnetic Society Fellow.
- 1971 IEEE W.R.G. Baker Award.
- 1973 Ballantine award in Computer and Cognitive Science. Presented by Franklin Institute.
- 1987 Achievement Award. Presented by Magnetic Society.
