= William H. Doherty =

William H. Doherty (August 21, 1907 – February 15, 2000) was an American electrical engineer noted for his invention of the Doherty amplifier.

Doherty was born in Cambridge, Massachusetts, received his B.S. degree in electrical communication engineering in 1927 and M.S. degree in engineering in 1928, both from Harvard University. After a few months in the American Telephone and Telegraph Company Long Lines Department in Boston, he joined the National Bureau of Standards to study radio phenomena. In 1929 he began work at Bell Telephone Laboratories where he developed high-power radio transmitters for transoceanic radio telephones and broadcasting.

In 1936, he invented a means to greatly improve the efficiency of RF power amplifiers, which was quickly termed the "Doherty amplifier" (U.S. Patent 2,210,028). It was first used in a 500-kilowatt transmitter made by Western Electric Company and proposed for WHAS, Louisville, Kentucky, but the Federal Communications Commission restricted broadcast stations to 50 kilowatts maximum power, and WHAS would go on to install a 50,000 watt Western Electric Doherty transmitter. By 1940, Western Electric had incorporated Doherty amplifiers in 35 commercial radio stations worldwide, nearly all of these at the 50,000 watt level, and employing a 5,000 watt driver of conventional design. Post-World War II Western Electric would offer 5,000 and 10,000 watt Doherty transmitters, and several were installed in the United States as backup transmitters for Class I (now Class A) stations, and a few as main transmitters for Class II/III (now Class B) stations.

Doherty received the 1937 IEEE Morris N. Liebmann Memorial Award for his improvement in the efficiency of radio-frequency power amplifiers.

== Selected works ==
- Doherty, W.H. (September 1936). "A New High Efficiency Power Amplifier for Modulated Waves". Proceedings of the IRE. 24 (9): 1163–1182. doi:10.1109/JRPROC.1936.228468.
- US Expired US2210028A, Doherty, William H., "Amplifier", published 1940-08-06, assigned to Bell Telephone Labs
