= Antoinette Taylor =

American physicist

Antoinette Jane (Toni) Taylor is an American physicist known for her research on metamaterials and nanophotonics including terahertz metamaterials for controlling and generating submillimeter radiation. She is Associate Laboratory Director, Physical Sciences at the Los Alamos National Laboratory.

== Education and career ==
Taylor was a student at Stanford University, earning bachelor's, master's, and doctoral degrees in physics there in 1977, 1979, and 1982 respectively. Her dissertation, Two-Step Polarization Labeling Spectroscopy of Excited States of Diatomic Sodium, was supervised by Arthur Leonard Schawlow.

She was a postdoctoral researcher at Cornell University and a researcher at Bell Laboratories before joining the Los Alamos National Laboratory in 1986. At Los Alamos, projects and teams that she has participated in include the Los Alamos Bright Source, Pulsed Power Hydrodynamics Program, Center for Integrated Nanotechnologies, and Division of Materials Physics and Applications.

== Service and recognition ==
Taylor has served as chair of the Division of Laser Science of the American Physical Society. She was named a Fellow of the American Physical Society in 2001, after a nomination from the Division of Laser Science, "for pioneering developments of ultrafast optoelectric techniques and their use in understanding dynamical processes in electronic materials and devices". In 2009, she was named a Los Alamos National Laboratory Fellow. She is also a Fellow of the Optical Society of America and a Fellow of the American Association for the Advancement of Science.
