= Raymond A. Heising =

American radio and telephone pioneer (1888–1965)

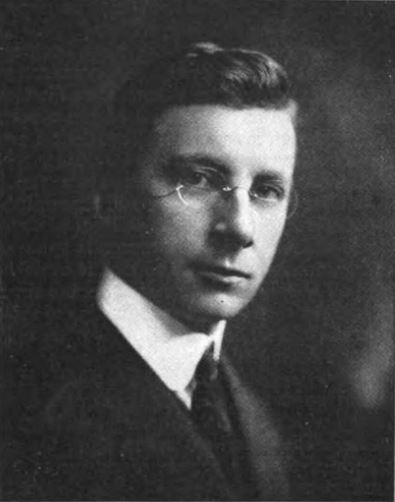
Raymond A. Heising (1922)

Raymond Alphonsus Heising (August 10, 1888 – January 1965) was an American radio and telephone pioneer.

Heising was born in Albert Lea, Minnesota, graduated in 1912 in electrical engineering from the University of North Dakota, and in 1914 received his master's degree from the University of Wisconsin–Madison. From 1914 until his retirement in 1953, Dr. Heising worked for the Western Electric Company and Bell Labs, and subsequently as a consulting engineer and patent agent.

Heising played a major role in the development of military radio telephone systems during World War I, and for transoceanic and ship-to-shore public communications. He also conducted research on ultra-short waves, electronics, and piezoelectric devices, and invented important modulation systems including the constant potential system, the grid modulation system, the rectifier modulation system used in carrier telephony, and the constant-current or Heising modulation system, which was standard on most early radio telephone transceivers.

Heising held over 100 patents, including those on Class C amplifiers and diode-triode detector amplifier circuits, and was a Fellow of the American Institute of Electrical Engineers and American Physical Society. He was awarded the 1921 IEEE Morris N. Liebmann Memorial Award, the Modern Pioneer Award from the National Association of Manufacturers in 1940, an honorary Doctor of Science degree from the University of North Dakota in 1947, and the Radio Club of America's Armstrong Medal in 1954.
