= Siegfried K. Wiedmann =

Siegfried K. Wiedmann (born in 1938) is a German electrical engineer noted for his contributions to semiconductor technologies for integrated circuits.

Wiedmann was born in Plochingen, Germany. He received the Diplom-Ingenieur (1963) and Doctor-Ingenieur (1967) degrees in electrical engineering from the University of Applied Sciences Stuttgart, then worked at the IBM Laboratories in Böblingen, Germany and in the United States, ultimately becoming an IBM Fellow. Together with Horst H. Berger, Wiedmann received the 1977 IEEE Morris N. Liebmann Memorial Award "for the invention and exploration of the Merged Transistor Logic, MTL".

== Selected works ==
- H. H. Berger and S. K. Wiedmann, "Merged-Transistor Logic (MTL) - A Low-Cost Bipolar Logic Concept", IEEE Journal of Solid-State Circuits, vol. SC-7, No. 5, Oct. 1972, pp. 340–346.
