= Paul Charles Michaelis =

Paul Charles Michaelis was a Bell Labs researcher in magnetic bubble memory.

== Education ==
Michaelis was born June 18, 1935, in New York City, raised in New Jersey on a Scotch Plains farm, went to high School in Scotch Plain, First worked in Bell Labs, Murray Hill, New Jersey, starting career as a junior draftsman, attended its drafting school. Subsequently, attended NCE Newark College of Engineering, (now "New Jersey Institute of Technology") Received BSEE, BSME and MS physics. After several promotions was promoted to member of Bell Laboratories technical staff and subsequently promoted to technical manager, New Jersey.

== Career ==
Michaelis spent 43 years with Bell Labs, primarily in Murray Hill and Whippany.

He primarily dealt with mechanics, magnetics, fiber optics, electrical circuits, device packaging, acoustic surveillance and vibration reduction. He also worked on underwater surveillance devices and equipment silencing for the United States Navy.

Michaelis was a guest lecturer in magnetics at the Soviet Academy of Sciences USSR in 1972, lecturing at the University of Moscow, University in Tbilisi, Soviet Georgia and the Semiconductor Institute in Leningrad [now St Petersburg].

Michaelis retired from Bell Labs in 1996 as technical manager of the Advanced Vibration Reduction Design Group.

== Notable awards ==
Michaelis received the 1975 IEEE Morris N. Liebmann Memorial Award "for the concept and development of single-walled magnetic domains (magnetic bubbles), and for recognition of their importance to memory technology." The single walled concept was the seminal idea that led to "magnetic bubbles" and charge coupled devices.
