= Browder J. Thompson =

Browder J. Thompson (August 14, 1903 – July 4/5, 1944) was a noted American electrical engineer.

Thompson was born in Roanoke, Louisiana, and in 1925 received his Bachelor of Science degree in electrical engineering from the University of Washington, Seattle. In 1926 he joined General Electric's research laboratory to design vacuum tubes. In 1931 he transferred to the RCA Radiotron Company, in Harrison, New Jersey, as part of the company's antitrust settlement, to lead its electrical research. In 1941 he was elected a Fellow of the American Physical Society. Thompson was co-director of RCA Laboratories, Princeton, New Jersey, from 1942 until December, 1943, when he accepted a special assignment for the Secretary of War. He was killed in action in World War II while observing an air-to-ground radar during a night flight over Italy.

Thompson was a Fellow of the Institute of Radio Engineers, and received the 1936 IEEE Morris N. Liebmann Memorial Award "for his contribution to the vacuum-tube art in the field of very-high frequencies." The Browder J. Thompson Prize Award was named in his honor.
