= Benjamin Abeles =

Austrian-Czech physicist (1925–2020)

- Born: Bedrich Abeles; 23 June 1925; Vienna, Austria
- Died: 14 December 2020 (aged 95); Leicester, England
- Education: Charles University in Prague, Czech Technical University in Prague
- Awards: 1979 Stuart Ballantine Medal
- Scientific career
- Fields: material physics
- Institutions: David Sarnoff Research Center, Exxon Research and Engineering, Annandale, New Jersey.
- Thesis: The Galvanomagnetic Effects in Bismuth and Bi-Sn Alloys (1955)

Benjamin Abeles (23 June 1925 – 14 December 2020) was an Austrian-Czech physicist whose research in the 1960s in the US on germanium–silicon alloys led to the technology used to power space probes such as the Voyager spacecraft. He grew up in Austria and Czechoslovakia and arrived in the UK in 1939 on one of the Kindertransport missions. He completed his education after the war in Czechoslovakia and Israel (from 1949), obtaining a doctorate in physics. He then lived and worked as a research physicist in the US and retired in 1995. His honours include the 1979 Stuart Ballantine Medal and his induction into the New Jersey Inventors Hall of Fame (1991).

== Early life and education ==
Born in Vienna in 1925 as Bedrich Abeles, to an Ashkenazi Jewish family. His mother Selma was of Austrian Jewish origins. Abele's father, Ernst, came from a well-to-do Czech Jewish family. Abeles lived in Czechoslovakia from 1934. In July 1939, aged 14, he was one of hundreds of Jewish children brought from Prague to London through the efforts of British humanitarian Nicholas Winton, an example of the various Kindertransport missions that saved many such children from the impending dangers of World War II and the Holocaust. His parents and older sister were later deported and murdered by the Nazis. At age 15, he worked as a waiter and took correspondence courses in English, mathematics, physics and chemistry. When he was 18, Abeles served as a mechanic in the war as part of No. 311 Squadron RAF. He then returned to Czechoslovakia after the war and studied at Charles University in Prague and Czech Technical University in Prague, before moving to Israel in 1949 to study for his physics doctorate in Jerusalem. His thesis, published in 1955, was titled 'The Galvanomagnetic Effects in Bismuth and Bi–Sn Alloys'.

== Career ==
Following the award of his PhD, Abeles worked in Israel on germanium electronics before moving to the United States to carry out research in Princeton for the Radio Corporation of America. During his career, Abeles worked at both the David Sarnoff Research Center and at Exxon Research and Engineering in Annandale, New Jersey. Working with George D. Cody in the 1960s, Abeles developed germanium–silicon alloys that were used in the development of the radioisotope thermoelectric generators used to power spacecraft and probes engaged in long voyages of space exploration. Abeles also worked as a professor at the University of Texas.

== Recognition and later life ==
For their work, Abeles and Cody received the 1979 Stuart Ballantine Medal (Engineering) from the Franklin Institute, and were inducted into the New Jersey Inventors Hall of Fame in 1991. Abeles's 65th birthday in 1990 was marked by a symposium in his honour: 'Physical Phenomena in Granular Materials'. He retired in 1995, and subsequently lived predominantly in the UK.

Abeles died in Leicester, England on 14 December 2020, aged 95.
