= Charles Ginsburg =

American engineer (1920–1992)

- Born: July 27, 1920; San Francisco, California, U.S.
- Died: April 9, 1992 (aged 71); Eugene, Oregon, U.S.
- Education: San Jose State University
- Occupation: Engineer
- Known for: Developer of first videotape recorder

Charles Paulson Ginsburg (July 27, 1920 – April 9, 1992) was an American engineer and the leader of a research team at Ampex which developed one of the first practical videotape recorders.

== Biography ==
Ginsburg was born on July 27, 1920, in San Francisco, California. At the age of two, he was diagnosed with type 1 diabetes. He attended Lowell High School in San Francisco.

Ginsburg earned a bachelor's degree from San Jose State University in 1948. He worked as an engineer at AM-radio station KQW (now KCBS). He joined Ampex in 1951, and remained there until his retirement in 1986, holding the title Vice President of Advanced Technology. The engineering team that helped create the videotape recorder while working for Ampex under his direction in early 1956 were Charles Andersen, Ray Dolby, Shelby Henderson, Fred Pfost, and Alex Maxey.

Ginsburg was elected a member of the National Academy of Engineering in 1973, being cited for invention and pioneering development of video magnetic tape recording for instant playback.

He died on April 9, 1992, in Eugene, Oregon, of pneumonia.

== Honors and awards ==
- David Sarnoff Award of the Society of Motion Picture and Television Engineers (SMPTE) (1957),
- Vladimir K. Zworykin Award of the Institute of Radio Engineers (1958),
- Valdemar Poulsen Gold Medal from the Danish Academy of Technical Sciences (1960)
- Howard N. Potts Medal from the Franklin Institute (1969)
- John Scott Medal from the Corporation of the city of Philadelphia
- Video Achievement Award from the former International Tape/Disc Association (1975)
- Inducted into the National Inventors Hall of Fame (1990).
- Inducted into the Consumer Electronics Hall of Fame (2000).

== US patents ==
- U.S. patent 3,003,025
- U.S. patent 2,968,692
- U.S. patent 2,956,114
- U.S. patent 2,921,990
- U.S. patent 2,916,547
- U.S. patent 2,916,546
- U.S. patent 2,866,012
