= Ernst Alexanderson =

Swedish-American electrical engineer and inventor (1878–1975)

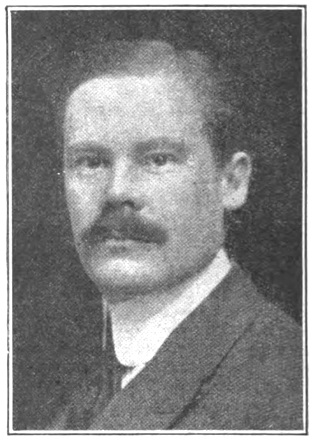
- Alexanderson in 1920
- Born: Ernst Frederick Werner Alexanderson; January 25, 1878; Uppsala, Sweden
- Died: May 14, 1975 (aged 97); Schenectady, New York, U.S.
- Education: University of Lund; KTH Royal Institute of Technology; Technische Hochschule
- Occupations: Engineer; inventor
- Known for: Inventing the Alexanderson alternator; Inventing the amplidyne; Inventing the TRF receiver
- Awards: IRE Medal of Honor (1919); AIEE Edison Medal (1944); Cedergren Medal (1944); Valdemar Poulsen Gold Medal (1947)
- Engineering career
- Discipline: Electrical engineering
- Employer(s): General Electric; Radio Corporation of America
- Significant advance: Radio

Ernst Frederick Werner Alexanderson (Swedish: [ɛʂnt alɛkˈsandɛʂɔn]; January 25, 1878 – May 14, 1975) was a Swedish-American electrical engineer and inventor who was a pioneer in radio development. He invented the Alexanderson alternator, an early radio transmitter used between 1906 and the 1930s for longwave long distance radio transmission. Alexanderson also created the amplidyne, a direct current amplifier used during the Second World War for controlling anti-aircraft guns.

== Background ==
Alexanderson was born in Uppsala, Sweden. He studied at the University of Lund (1896–97) and was educated at the Royal Institute of Technology in Stockholm and the Technische Hochschule in Berlin, Germany. He emigrated to the United States in 1902 and spent much of his life working for the General Electric and Radio Corporation of America.

== Engineering work ==
Alexanderson designed the Alexanderson alternator, an early longwave radio transmitter, one of the first devices which could transmit modulated audio (sound) over radio waves. He had been employed at General Electric for only a short time when GE received an order from Canadian-born professor and researcher Reginald Fessenden, then working for the US Weather Bureau, for a specialized alternator with much higher frequency than others in existence at that time, for use as a radio transmitter. Fessenden had been working on the problem of transmitting sound by radio waves, and had concluded that a new type of radio transmitter was needed, a continuous wave transmitter. Designing a machine that would rotate fast enough to produce radio waves proved a formidable challenge. Alexanderson's family were convinced the huge spinning rotors would fly apart and kill him, and he set up a sandbagged bunker from which to test them. In the summer of 1906 Mr. Alexanderson's first effort, a 50 kHz alternator, was installed in Fessenden's radio station in Brant Rock, Massachusetts. By fall its output had been improved to 500 watts and 75 kHz. On Christmas Eve, 1906, Fessenden made an experimental broadcast of Christmas music, including him playing the violin, that was heard by Navy ships and shore stations down the East Coast as far as Arlington. This is considered the first AM radio entertainment broadcast.

Alexanderson continued improving his machine, and the Alexanderson alternator became widely used in high power very low frequency commercial and Naval wireless stations to transmit radiotelegraphy traffic at intercontinental distances, until by the 1930s it was replaced by vacuum tube transmitters. The only surviving transmitter in a working state is at the Grimeton radio station outside Varberg, Sweden. It is a prime example of pre-electronic radio technology and was added as a UNESCO's World Heritage Site list in 2004.

Alexanderson was also instrumental in the development of television. The first television broadcast in the United States was received in 1927 at his GE Plot home at 1132 Adams Rd, Schenectady, N.Y. The following year he developed the coordination of sound and movement on the first television drama, The Queen's Messenger. In 1930, he conducted an early public demonstration of his large screen television system on a closed-circuit channel at Proctors in Schenectady.

Alexanderson retired from General Electric in 1948. The inventor and engineer remained active to an advanced age. He continued television research as a consultant for the Radio Corporation of America filing his 321st patent application in 1955. Over his lifetime, Alexanderson received 345 US patents, the last filed in 1968 at age 89. He died in 1975 and was buried at Vale Cemetery in Schenectady, New York.

Alexanderson is also mentioned in connection with the emergence of the patent system, that he was partially critical to. As the technology historian David Noble writes:

The change in the focus of the patent system, from the protection of the inventor to the protection of the corporation which either employed the inventor or purchased his patents, was succinctly phrased by E.F.W. Alexanderson, a Swedish immigrant who became one of GE's early leading research engineers. "The patent system was established, I believe", he said, "to protect the lone inventor. In this it has not succeeded ... the patent system protects the institutions which favor invention".

== Kidnapping incident ==
In 1923, Alexanderson's son, Verner, was kidnapped. Alexanderson broadcast an appeal for help on the radio. The child was located after three days and returned to his family. The kidnappers were later caught.

== Honors ==
- IEEE Medal of Honor from the Institute of Radio Engineers, now IEEE, (1919)
- IEEE Edison Medal from the American Institute of Electrical Engineers, now IEEE, (1944)
- Valdemar Poulsen Gold Medal from the Danish Academy of Technical Sciences (1947)
- National Inventors Hall of Fame induction (1983)
- Consumer Electronics Hall of Fame induction (2002)

== Patents ==
Ernst was very active and got a total of 345 patents granted.

- U.S. patent 1,008,577 – High frequency alternator (100 kHz), filed April 1909; issued, November 1911
- U.S. patent 1,173,079 – Selective Tuning System (Tuned RF Circuit, filed October 1913; issued February 1916
- U.S. patent 1,723,908 – Ignition system, (RFI suppressor), filed June 1926; issued August 1929
- U.S. patent 1,775,801 – Radio signaling system (directional antenna), filed November 1927, issued September 1930

== See also ==
- History of numerical control

== Other sources ==
- Blackwelder, Julia Kirk (2014) Electric City: General Electric in Schenectady (Texas A&M University Press) ISBN 978-1623491864
- Brittain, James E. (1992) Alexanderson: Pioneer in American Electrical Engineering (Johns Hopkins University Press) ISBN 978-0801842283
- Fisher, David E. and Marshall J. Fisher (1996) Tube, the Invention of Television (Counterpoint, Washington D.C) ISBN 1-887178-17-1

== Related reading ==
- Alexanderson, E.F.W. (August 1920) Trans-oceanic Radio Communication (Proceedings of the I.R.E., pp. 263–285)
