= Frederick B. Llewellyn =

American electrical engineer

Frederick Britton Llewellyn (September 16, 1897 – December 10, 1971) was a noted American electrical engineer.

Llewellyn was born in New Orleans, Louisiana. He took a course at the Marconi School for Wireless Operators in 1915, spent some three years in the merchant marine, and almost a year in the Navy in 1917-18. He then studied under Professor Alan Hazeltine at Stevens Institute of Technology, receiving his M.E. degree in 1922. After a year as laboratory assistant to Dr. F. K. Vreeland, he joined Western Electric in 1923, transferring in 1925 to Bell Telephone Laboratories, where he worked on the long-wave transatlantic telephone based in Rocky Point, New York. From 1924-28 he studied at Columbia University, receiving his Ph.D. in 1928.

Llewellyn helped develop the first public ship-to-shore telephone service, inaugurated in 1929 on the SS Leviathan. In the 1930s he studied noise in vacuum tubes and constant-frequency oscillators, and researched the behavior of vacuum tubes at very high frequencies. During World War II, he served as a consultant to the Office of Secretary of War. He and Edwin H. Armstrong designed a sensitive receiver used to detect a radar signal reflected from the Moon (Project Diana).

After the war, he served as a consulting engineer, primarily on military electronics systems, assistant to the President of Bell Telephone Laboratories 1956-1961, affiliate of the Institute of Science and Technology at the University of Michigan 1961-1965, and research director of the Polytechnic Institute of Brooklyn 1965 until retirement in 1967.

Llewellyn was president of the Institute of Radio Engineers in 1946, and awarded the 1936 IEEE Morris N. Liebmann Memorial Award for his results on high-frequency electronics and constant-frequency oscillators.

== Selected works ==
Books

- Electron-Inertia Effects, Cambridge University Press, 1941.

Patents

- U.S. patent 2,453,716 : "High frequency tank circuit" (Bell Telephone Laboratories)
- U.S. patent 2,142,138 : "Guided wave transmission" (Bell Telephone Laboratories)

== Links ==
- Proceedings of the IRE
- Biography by James E. Brittain
- Proceedings of the Institute of Radio Engineers, Volume 18, Number 1, January, 1930
- Radar Echoes from the Moon, January 1946
- "Frederick Llewellyn, Top Engineer, Dies", Washington Post, December 11, 1971.
