= Ping King Tien =

Chinese-American electrical engineer (1919–2017)

Ping King Tien (Chinese: 田炳耕; pinyin: Tián Bǐnggēng; August 2, 1919 – December 27, 2017) was a Chinese-American electrical engineer and scientist, noted for his contributions to microwave amplifiers and integrated optical circuits.

== Biography ==
Tien was born in Shangyu, Shaoxing, Chekiang (Zhejiang) province, China. He did his undergraduate studies in the National Central University in Nanjing (the predecessor of Nanjing University and Southeast University in Mainland China) and Shanghai Jiao Tong University. He received his B.S. in electrical engineering in 1942. Tien continued his study in the United States, and received his master's degree in 1948 and PhD in 1951 both from the Stanford University.

Tien then joined Bell Labs to work with John Robinson Pierce, eventually becoming head of Electronics Research (1959), Electron-Physics Research (1966), Micro-Electronics Research (1980), High Speed Electronics Research (1984), and fellow in the Photonics Research Laboratory (1989). He died in December 2017 at the age of 98.

== Honors and awards ==
Tien has received several honors and awards, including:

- Elected Member of the United States National Academy of Sciences (in 1978)
- Elected Member of the United States National Academy of Engineering (in 1975)
- Elected Academician of the Academia Sinica (in 1988)
- Elected Fellow of the Institute of Electrical and Electronics Engineers
- Elected Fellow of the Optical Society of America
- Elected Member of the Third World Academy of Sciences
- Elected Foreign Member of the Chinese Academy of Engineering
- 1979, IEEE Morris N. Liebmann Memorial Award "for contributions to integrated optics technology"
