= Arthur Leonard Schawlow =

American physicist (1921–1999)

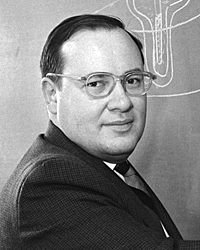
- Born: May 5, 1921; Mount Vernon, New York, U.S.
- Died: April 28, 1999 (aged 77); Palo Alto, California, U.S.
- Education: University of Toronto (grad. 1941, 1942, 1949)
- Known for: Laser cooling; Schawlow–Townes approximation
- Spouse: Aurelia Townes (m. 1951)
- Children: 3
- Awards: Stuart Ballantine Medal (1962); IEEE Morris N. Liebmann Memorial Award (1964); Richtmyer Memorial Award (1970); Frederic Ives Medal (1976); Marconi Prize (1977); Nobel Prize for Physics (1981); National Medal of Science (1991)
- Scientific career
- Fields: Physics
- Workplaces: Bell Labs; Stanford University
- Doctoral advisor: Malcolm F. Crawford
- Doctoral students: Wendell T. Hill; Antoinette Taylor; Michael Duryea Williams

Arthur Leonard Schawlow (May 5, 1921 – April 28, 1999) was an American physicist who, along with Charles Townes, developed the theoretical basis for laser science. His central insight was the use of two mirrors as the resonant cavity to take maser action from microwaves to visible wavelengths. He shared the 1981 Nobel Prize in Physics with Nicolaas Bloembergen and Kai Siegbahn for his work using lasers to determine atomic energy levels with great precision.

== Biography ==
Arthur Leonard Schawlow was born on May 5, 1921, in Mount Vernon, New York, to a Jewish father from Riga and a Canadian mother. Schawlow was raised in his mother's Protestant faith. When Arthur was three years old, they moved to Toronto, Ontario, Canada.

At the age of 16, Schawlow completed high school at Vaughan Road Collegiate Institute, and received a scholarship in science at the University of Toronto (Victoria College). He obtained his B.A. in 1941 and his M.A. the following year. He received his Ph.D. in 1949 under Professor Malcolm F. Crawford. Schawlow then took a postdoctoral position with Charles Townes in the Physics Department of Columbia University in the fall of 1949.

Schawlow went on to accept a position at Bell Telephone Laboratories in late 1951. He left in 1961 to become Professor of Physics at Stanford University, where he remained until his retirement in 1991.

Although his research focused on optics, in particular lasers and their use in spectroscopy, Schawlow also pursued investigations in the areas of superconductivity and nuclear resonance. Schawlow shared the 1981 Nobel Prize in Physics with Nicolaas Bloembergen and Kai Siegbahn for their contributions to the development of laser spectroscopy.

Schawlow co-authored the widely used text Microwave Spectroscopy (1955) with Charles Townes. Schawlow and Townes were the first to publish the theory of laser design and operation in their seminal 1958 paper on "optical masers", although Gordon Gould is often credited with the "invention" of the laser, due to his unpublished work that predated Schawlow and Townes by a few months. The first working laser was made in 1960 by Theodore Maiman.

== Science and religion ==
Schawlow participated in science and religion discussions. Regarding God, he stated, "I find a need for God in the universe and in my own life."

== Personal life ==
In 1951, Schawlow married Aurelia Townes, the younger sister of Charles Townes. They had three children: Arthur Jr., Helen, and Edith. Arthur Jr. is autistic, with very little speech ability. Aurelia died in 1991 following a vehicle accident.

Schawlow and Professor Robert Hofstadter at Stanford, who also had an autistic child, teamed up to help each other find solutions to the condition. Arthur Jr. was put in a special center for autistic individuals, and later, Schawlow put together an institution to care for people with autism in Paradise, California. It was later named the Arthur Schawlow Center in 1999, shortly before his death. Schawlow was a promoter of the controversial method of facilitated communication with patients of autism.

Schawlow considered himself to be an orthodox Protestant Christian, and attended a Methodist church. Arthur Schawlow was an intense fan and collector of traditional American jazz recordings, as well as a supporter of instrumental groups performing this type of music.

Schawlow died of leukemia on April 28, 1999, in Palo Alto, California, at the age of 77.

== Recognition ==
=== Awards ===
Year	Organization	Award	Citation	Ref.
1962	(United States) Franklin Institute	Stuart Ballantine Medal (Note: Shared with Charles Townes.)	"For theoretical work on MASER operation."	
1963	(United Kingdom) Institute of Physics	Thomas Young Medal and Prize	—	
1964	(United States) IEEE	IEEE Morris N. Liebmann Memorial Award	"For his pioneering and continuing contributions in the field of optical masers."	
1970	(United States) AAPT	Richtmyer Memorial Award	—	
1976	(United States) Optical Society of America	Frederic Ives Medal	"In recognition of his pioneering role in the invention of the laser, his continuing originality in the refinement of coherent optical sources, his productive vision in the application of optics to science and technology, his distinguished service to optics education and to the optics community, and his innovative contributions to the public understanding of optical science."	
1977	(United States) Marconi Society	Marconi Prize	"For his research in the fields of optical and microwave spectroscopy, nuclear quadruple resonance superconductivity and lasers."	
1981	(Sweden) Royal Swedish Academy of Sciences	Nobel Prize in Physics (Note: Shared with Nicolaas Bloembergen and Kai Siegbahn.)	"For their contribution to the development of laser spectroscopy."	

=== Honorary degrees ===
Year	University	Degree	Ref.
1968	(Belgium) Ghent University	Doctor of Science	
1970	(Canada) University of Toronto	Doctor of Laws	
1986	(Republic of Ireland) Trinity College Dublin	Doctor of Science	

=== Memberships ===
Year	Organization	Type	Ref.
1970	(United States) American Academy of Arts and Sciences	Member	
1970	(United States) National Academy of Sciences	Member	
1983	(United States) Optical Society of America	Honorary Member	
1984	(United States) American Philosophical Society	Member	

=== National awards ===
Year	Head of state	Award	Citation	Ref.
1991	(United States) George H. W. Bush	National Medal of Science	"For his role in the conception of the laser and in advancing its applications, especially in laser spectroscopy."	

== Commemoration ==
In 1991, the American Physical Society established the Arthur L. Schawlow Prize in Laser Science. The Prize is awarded annually to "candidates who have made outstanding contributions to basic research using lasers."

== Bibliography ==
- Schawlow, A L (1995), "Principles of lasers", Journal of Clinical Laser Medicine & Surgery, vol. 13, no. 3 (published June 1995), pp. 127–30, doi:10.1089/clm.1995.13.127, PMID 10150635
- Schawlow, AL (1982), "Spectroscopy in a New Light", Science, vol. 217, no. 4554 (published July 2, 1982), pp. 9–16, Bibcode:1982Sci...217....9S, doi:10.1126/science.217.4554.9, PMID 17739964
- Schawlow, AL (1978), "Laser Spectroscopy of Atoms and Molecules", Science, 202 (4364) (published October 13, 1978): 141–147, Bibcode:1978Sci...202..141S, doi:10.1126/science.202.4364.141, PMID 17801904
- McCaul, B W; Schawlow, A L (1969), "Plasma refractive effects in HCN lasers", Ann. N. Y. Acad. Sci., vol. 168, no. 3 (published February 10, 1969), pp. 697–702, Bibcode:1969NYASA.168..697M, doi:10.1111/j.1749-6632.1969.tb43154.x, PMID 5273948, S2CID 31588499
- Schawlow, A L (1966), "Lasers", International Ophthalmology Clinics, vol. 6, no. 2, pp. 241–51, doi:10.1097/00004397-196600620-00002, PMID 5958291

== See also ==
- Optical Society of America#Past Presidents of the OSA
- List of Jewish Nobel laureates
