= Wendell T. Hill =

African-American physicist

Wendell Talbot Hill III
- Born: 1952 (age 73–74); Berkeley, California
- Education: UC Irvine; Stanford University
- Scientific career
- Workplaces: University of Maryland
- Thesis: [ProQuest 303065514 Intracavity Absorption Spectroscopy] (1980)
- Doctoral advisor: Arthur L. Schawlow
- Other academic advisors: Theodor W. Hänsch; Richard Zare

Wendell Talbot Hill III (born 1952) is an American physicist and professor at the University of Maryland. His research career has largely focused on the intersection of laser physics and quantum science.

== Early life and education ==
Wendell Hill was born in 1952 in Berkeley, California. His father, Wendell Hill, Jr., was the Chief Pharmacist at in the Orange County Medical Center (now the University of California Irvine Medical Center) in the 1960s, and later served as dean of Howard University’s College of Pharmacy in the 1990s. His mother, Marcella Washington Hill, was a mathematics teacher who taught at the University of the District of Columbia.

Hill attended and graduated from Villa Park High School in Orange, California, in 1970. For his undergraduate studies, he attended the University of California, Irvine, where he received his bachelor's degree in physics in 1974. In 1976, he received his master's degree in physics from Stanford University, and in 1980, he earned a PhD in physics from Stanford University. At Stanford, he was an IBM pre-doctoral fellow (1974-1975) and his thesis was titled "Intracavity Absorption Spectroscopy" and submitted in July 1980. His thesis advisor was Arthur L. Schawlow, and Theodor W. Hänsch and Richard Zare were also on his thesis advisory committee. Hill was also a member of the Schawlow/Hänsch research group while at Stanford.

== Career ==
From 1980 to 1982, Hill was a National Research Council postdoctoral fellow at the National Bureau of Standards (now the National Institute of Standards & Technology), in Gaithersburg, Maryland. He subsequently joined the faculty at the Institute for Physical Science and Technology (IPST) at the University of Maryland. He began as a research assistant scientist, before being promoted to assistant professor and later associate professor. In 1996, Hill was made full professor at the University of Maryland, and in 2006 he became a fellow of the Joint Quantum Institute.

During his career, his has held visiting teaching and research positions at the Lawrence Livermore National Labsoratory, the Instituto Venezalano de Investigaciones, the Université de Paris, Orsay, as Guest Scientist at the NIST, and at JILA at the University of Colorado, Boulder.

Between 1999 and 2002, Hill was director of the Laboratory for Atomic, Molecular & Optical Science, and Engineering at the University of Maryland. From 2010 to 2012 he was Program Director of the Atomic, Molecular and Optical (AMO) Physics program at the NSF.

Hill has held multiple professional appointments throughout his career. He has served as an executive committee member of the Division of Laser Science and the Committee on Minorities for the American Physical Society, and chaired the Optical Physics Technical Group for Optical Society of America (now Optica). He also chaired the Committee on Atomic Molecular and Optical Science and the Board on Physics and Astronomy for the National Academy of Sciences.

As of 2022, he is also director of the graduate Chemical Physics Program at the University of Maryland.

== Research ==
Hill's research has focused on ultrafast dynamics and quantum information, as well as on topics such as high-energy particle physics to ultracold atoms.

== Select publications ==
- Hill, Wendell T.; Lee, Chi H. (2006). Light-Matter Interaction: Atoms and Molecules in External Fields and Nonlinear Optics. John Wiley & Sons. ISBN 978-3-527-40661-6.
- Andrews, David L. (2009). Encyclopedia of Applied Spectroscopy. Wiley. ISBN 978-3-527-40773-6.

== Awards ==
- Presidential Young Investigator Award (now the Presidential Early Career Award), National Science Foundation (NSF), 1985
- Fellow, the American Physical Society (APS)
- Fellow, the National Society of Black Physicists (NSBP)
- Fellow, the African Scientific Institute
- Member, the American Academy of Arts and Sciences, 2023

== Personal life ==
Hill married his wife, Patricia Hill, while at Stanford University, and they have three children.
