= Horst H. Berger =

German electrical engineer

Horst H. Berger (born March 30, 1933) is a German electrical engineer noted for his contributions to semiconductor technologies for integrated circuits.

Berger was born in Liegnitz (Legnica), Lower Silesia, and received the Vordiplom. from the Technische Hochschule of Dresden, then worked at the IBM Laboratories in Böblingen. Afterwards he became a researcher and teacher at Technische Universität Berlin.

Together with Siegfried K. Wiedmann, Berger received the 1977 IEEE Morris N. Liebmann Memorial Award "for the invention and exploration of the Merged Transistor Logic, MTL".

== Selected works ==
- H. H. Berger and S. K. Wiedmann, "Merged-Transistor Logic (MTL) – A Low-Cost Bipolar Logic Concept", IEEE Journal of Solid-State Circuits, vol. SC-7, No. 5, Oct. 1972, pp. 340–346.
