= Harald T. Friis =

Danish-American radio engineer

Harald Trap Friis
- Born: 22 February 1893; Næstved, Zealand, Denmark
- Died: 15 June 1976 (aged 83); Palo Alto, California, United States
- Education: Technical University of Denmark; Columbia University
- Known for: Friis transmission equation; Friis formulas for noise; Horn-reflector antenna; Rhombic antenna
- Awards: Stuart Ballantine Medal (1958); Valdemar Poulsen Medal (1956); IEEE Medal of Honor (1955); IRE Morris Liebmann Memorial Prize (1939)
- Scientific career
- Fields: Electrical engineering
- Workplaces: Bell Labs

Harald Trap Friis (22 February 1893 – 15 June 1976), who published as H. T. Friis, was a Danish-American radio engineer whose work at Bell Laboratories included pioneering contributions to radio propagation, radio astronomy, and radar. His two Friis formulas remain widely used.

== Background ==
Friis was born in Næstved, Denmark. In 1916, he received his electrical engineering degree from the Technical University of Denmark. After a stint at the Royal Gun Factory, in 1919 he received a Columbia University fellowship to study radio engineering under John H. Morecroft. In 1920 Friis joined a Western Electric Company research group which in 1925 became part of Bell Laboratories. There he remained for his entire professional career.

== Career ==
Friis' first important publications were his 1923 Institute of Radio Engineers (IRE) paper on radio transmission measurements, 1925 IRE paper on directional antennas, and 1928 IRE paper on oscillographic observations of propagation phenomena. These papers documented studies of field strength and noise over a wide range of frequencies and stressed the importance of the signal-to-noise ratio (SNR) in receivers rather than simple field strength.

During the early 1930s Friis helped design the radio receiver used by Karl Jansky for radio astronomy, and with Edmond Bruce invented the rhombic antenna widely used for shortwave communications. In 1938 Friis became the director of the Holmdel Radio Laboratory developing microwave systems, where he and Alfred C. Beck designed the horn reflector antenna, which was widely used in AT&T's national microwave relay network in the 1960s. During World War II, Friis invented a "rocking horse" mechanical scanner for radar used to locate enemy mortars. He also authorized research into the first germanium diodes (Teal, 1942).

In 1946 Friis published his well-known analytic formula for power transfer between two antenna, the Friis transmission equation, which is still widely employed. In 1958 he retired but continued as a research consultant to the Hewlett-Packard Company as a friend of David Packard. He held 31 U.S. patents.

Friis died on 15 June 1976, at age 83, of a stroke in Palo Alto, California.

== Awards ==
Friis received the IRE Morris N. Liebmann Award in 1939, the IRE Medal of Honor (now the IEEE Medal of Honor) in 1955, the Valdemar Poulsen Gold Medal of the Danish Academy of Technical Sciences in 1956, the Stuart Ballantine Medal from the Franklin Institute in 1958 and the Mervin Kelly Award of the IEEE in 1964.

== Selected works ==
- Seventy Five Years in an Exciting World, (1971)
- Antennas: Theory and Practice, (1952) – with Sergei A. Schelkunoff
- Proceedings of the IRE, vol. 34, p. 254, (1946) – Friis transmission equation
- A New Directional Receiving System, (1925)
- High Frequency Amplifiers, (1924)

== Work papers ==
The papers of Harald Trap Friis span the years 1921 to 1976. These documents are available to the public and are maintained at the Manuscript Division, Library of Congress, Washington, D.C.

== Other sources ==
- Teal, Gordon K. (July 1976). "Single Crystals of Germanium and Silicon—Basic to the Transistor and Integrated Circuit". IEEE Transactions on Electron Devices. 23 (7). IEEE: 621–639. Bibcode:1976ITED...23..621T. doi:10.1109/T-ED.1976.18464. S2CID 11910543.
