= Orthoferrite =

An orthoferrite is any of a class of chemical compounds with the formula RFeO_{3}, where R is one or more rare-earth elements. Orthoferrites have an orthorhombic crystal structure with a space group Pbnm and most are weakly ferromagnetic. At the Néel temperature $T_N$ the subsystem of iron ions orders into a slightly canted antiferromagnetic structure with antiferromagnetic moment G and a weak ferromagnetic moment F. The rare-earth ion subsystem acquires magnetization m due to an interaction with the iron subsystem.

The orthoferrites are particularly interesting because of the presence of an antisymmetric exchange interaction which involves the vector cross product of neighboring spins as opposed to the usual scalar product. In the absence of this interaction, the orthoferrites would be antiferromagnetic. Its presence leads to a small canting of the sublattices, making the orthoferrites “weak” ferromagnets with $4 \pi M_s = 100 G$. Another interesting feature of these materials is the fact that some of them exhibit a transition as a function of temperature, in which the direction of the antiferromagnetically ordered spins and consequently also of the net magnetization rotates by 90°.

== Applications ==
The combination of high magnetic resonance frequencies with very large magnetooptical effects makes the orthoferrites interesting objects for study of laser-induced dynamics. Orthoferrites are transparent, and can modify the polarisation of a beam of light under the control of a magnetic field (Faraday rotation). This makes them potentially useful as optical sensors and actuators for use in optical communications. They were also once used as the magnetic material in bubble memory.

== Examples ==
- Lanthanum orthoferrite, LaFeO_{3}
- Dysprosium orthoferrite, DyFeO_{3}
