= James R. Boddie =

American electrical engineer

James R. Boddie is an electrical engineer noted for his role in creating the AT&T DSP1, a pioneering digital signal processor from Bell Labs.

Boddie was subsequently Bell Labs Fellow and Director of DSP Technology Development for Lucent Technologies, and Executive Director at StarCore LLC. He received the 1988 IEEE Morris N. Liebmann Memorial Award "for contributions to the realization of practical single chip digital signal processors".
