= Doherty amplifier =

Type of radio frequency amplifier

The Doherty amplifier is a high-efficiency linear radio-frequency power amplifier originally developed for high-power amplitude-modulated broadcasting. It was introduced by William H. Doherty of Bell Telephone Laboratories in 1936 as a means of maintaining high efficiency over the modulation cycle, particularly in transmitters operating at tens to hundreds of kilowatts, where power consumption and operating cost were significant concerns.

In the classical Doherty configuration, one amplifier tube (carrier) supplies the required output power under unmodulated carrier conditions, while a second tube (peaking) conducts only during positive modulation peaks. Through a coupling network, the load impedance presented to the carrier amplifier is dynamically reduced as the peaking amplifier contributes power. This allows both tubes to operate at high efficiency throughout the modulation cycle and to share the power required for positive modulation peaks. The coupling network functions as a quarter-wave impedance inverter, and the carrier and peaking amplifiers are driven with radio-frequency signals that are ninety degrees out of phase.

Early Western Electric Doherty systems used a modulated driver transmitter, typically 5 kW in 50 kW broadcast installations, with the Doherty amplifier providing the final power stage.

== Commercial development ==
After its introduction in 1936, the Doherty amplifier progressed from a laboratory demonstration into commercial broadcast equipment. Western Electric developed and marketed AM broadcast transmitters using the Doherty architecture, documenting their installation and use in contemporary promotional literature.

Later historical reviews indicate that some broadcast stations operating these transmitters reported reductions in operating costs, particularly in electrical power consumption. A retrospective article in ''Radio World'' describes broadcaster claims of lower utility expenses and reduced heat dissipation attributed to higher average efficiency, especially under typical program conditions where full modulation peaks occurred infrequently. These reports reflect how the Doherty amplifier was perceived by broadcasters in practical service rather than in controlled performance tests.

The technical influence of the Doherty amplifier extended well beyond its initial broadcast applications. Doherty applied for the original patent in 1936, and it was issued in 1940 as U.S. Patent 2,210,028. This patent was cited extensively in later work, including at least 154 subsequent patents.

Subsequent patents explored variations on the original concept while retaining the principle of dynamic load sharing. These included alternative circuits and device operating modes. A later patent by Weldon described a configuration in which one stage operated as a cathode follower, illustrating refinement of the original architecture rather than its replacement.

== Non-broadcast developments ==
Modern analyses have revisited classical high-efficiency RF power amplifier techniques, such as those of Doherty, and have shown their continued relevance. A detailed analysis is given in the 2002 literature.
