= Robert B. Dome =

American electrical engineer (1905–1996)

Robert B. Dome (October 12, 1905 - January 18, 1996) was an American electrical engineer credited with inventing frequency interlace color television modulation, which was compatible with existing black and white television sets.

Dome received his BSEE in 1926 from Purdue University, and worked for General Electric in Syracuse, New York. He also invented techniques for audio transmission, and received the 1951 IEEE Morris N. Liebmann Memorial Award "for many technical contributions to the profession, but notably his contributions to the inter-carrier sound system of television reception, wide band phase shift networks, and various simplifying innovations in FM receiver circuits." He was also a licensed radio amateur and a respected technical contributor to that community as W2WAM and may have held other call signs at other times (help needed). As W2WAM, he was known throughout the Amateur community as a leading single sideband (SSB) pioneer and advocate.

== Selected works ==
- "Wide band phase shift networks", Electronics, vol. 19, pages 112–115. December 1946.
- "Frequency interlace color television", Electronics, pages 70–75. September 1950.
- Television principles, New York, McGraw-Hill, 1951.
- "Spectrum Utilization in Color Television", Proceedings of the IRE, volume 39, issue 10, pages 1323–1331, October 1951.
- "The delta sound system for television receivers", IRE Transactions on Audio, volume 7, issue 1, January 1959, Pages 16–21.
