= Kenneth Bullington =

American electrical engineer (1913–1984)

Kenneth Bullington (January 11, 1913 – May 30, 1984) was an American electrical engineer known for his studies of radio propagation.

Bullington work at Bell Labs, Holmdel, New Jersey. Between 1950–1951, he performed pioneering research on tropospheric scatter, collecting data over paths ranging 200 to 300 miles in length, and pointed out the potential applications for communications in papers published in the Proceedings of the I.R.E. in 1950 and 1953. In 1953, he also published the first article foreshadowing cellular radio systems in "Frequency Economy in Mobile Radio Bands".

Bullington received the 1956 IEEE Morris N. Liebmann Memorial Award "for his contributions to the knowledge of tropospheric transmission beyond the horizon, and to the application of the principles of such transmission to practical communications systems", and the Franklin Institute's 1956 Stuart Ballantine Medal for his studies of space communications.

== Selected works ==
- "Frequency Economy in Mobile Radio Bands", Bell System Technical Journal, volume 32: 42 et. seq. January 1953.
- K. Bullington, W. J. Inkster, and A. L. Durkee, "Some tropospheric scatter propagation measurements near the radio-horizon", Proceedings of the IRE, October 1955, pages 1336–1340.
- "Radio Propagation Fundamentals", The Bell System Technical Journal, vol. XXXVI, no. 3, pages 593-626, May 1957.
- "Radio Propagation for Vehicular Communications", IEEE Transactions on Vehicular Technology, vol. VT-26, no. 4, November 1977.
