= Herbert John Shaw =

Dr. Herbert John Shaw (June 2, 1918 – January 19, 2006) was a professor at Stanford University, and a major inventor in the fields of fiber optic gyroscopes, optical communications, and surface acoustic wave devices.

Shaw was born in Seattle, and in 1941 received his bachelor's degree in electrical engineering from the University of Washington. He received his master's degree (1942) and doctorate (1948), both from Stanford's electrical engineering department, and subsequently joined the department as a research associate. In 1950 he transferred to Stanford's Microwave Laboratory, later renamed the Edward L. Ginzton Laboratory, as a research associate, and in 1977 became its associate director. Six years later, Shaw became a research professor in applied physics. He retired in 1989.

Shaw authored 291 technical publications and received about 100 U.S. patents, mostly in the field of photonics. He was a member of the National Academy of Engineering, and a fellow of the Institute of Electrical and Electronics Engineers. He received the 1976 IEEE Morris N. Liebmann Memorial Award "for contributions to the development of acoustic surface wave devices" and the 1981 Achievement Award of the IEEE Group on Sonics and Ultrasonics "for many contributions, through research and education, to ultrasonics technology."
