= Praveen Chaudhari =

Indian American physicist (1937-2010)

Parveen Chaudhari
- Born: November 30, 1937; Ludhiana, India
- Occupation: Scientist
- Spouse: Married

Praveen Chaudhari (November 30, 1937 – January 12, 2010) was an Indian American physicist who has contributed to the field of material physics. His research focused on structure and properties of amorphous solids, defects in solids, mechanical properties of thin films, superconductivity, quantum transport in disordered systems, liquid crystal alignment on substrates, and the magnetic monopole experiment. He published numerous papers and filed 22 patents, most notably one for the erasable read-write compact discs which are commonly used to burn music.

He was at IBM for 36 years during which he was appointed director and later vice president of science in 1981 and 1982. In 2004, he became director of Brookhaven National Laboratory (BNL) and stepped down in 2006.

Praveen died on January 12, 2010, at the age of 72.

== Accomplishments ==
Chaudhari was a member of scientific institutions such as the National Academy of Engineering, the National Academy of Sciences, the American Academy of Arts and Sciences and the American Physical Society. He served as executive secretary of President Reagan's Advisory Council on Superconductivity and served on the US National Critical Technology Panel.

His awards include the National Medal for Technology, the American Physical Society's George E. Pake Award, the Electrical and Electronics Engineers, Inc., Morris N. Liebmann Memorial Award, the Massachusetts Institute of Technology Harry C. Gatos Distinguished Lecture and Prize, and the National Medal of Technology.
