= Edward Victor Appleton =

British physicist (1892–1965)

Sir Edward Victor Appleton GBE KCB FRS
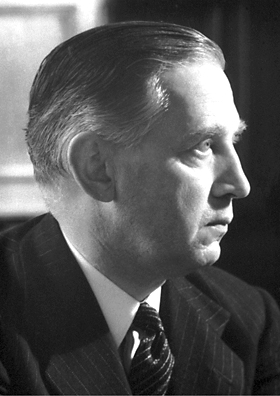
- Appleton in 1947

Principal and Vice-Chancellor of the University of Edinburgh
- In office 1949–1965
- Chancellor: Victor Hope, 2nd Marquess of Linlithgow; Prince Philip, Duke of Edinburgh
- Preceded by: Sir John Fraser
- Succeeded by: Lord Swann

Personal details
- Born: 6 September 1892 Bradford, England
- Died: 21 April 1965 (aged 72) Edinburgh, Scotland
- Resting place: Morningside Cemetery
- Spouses: Jessie Longson (m. 1915; died 1962) Helen Lennie (m. 1965)
- Children: 2
- Education: University of Cambridge (BA, MA)
- Known for: Discovering the E and F layers of the ionosphere
- Awards: Morris Liebmann Memorial Prize (1929); Hughes Medal (1933); Faraday Medal (1946); Nobel Prize in Physics (1947); Chree Medal and Prize (1947); Valdemar Poulsen Gold Medal (1948); Royal Medal (1950); Albert Medal (1950); IRE Medal of Honor (1962)
- Scientific career
- Fields: Physics
- Workplaces: University of Cambridge; King's College London; Department of Scientific and Industrial Research
- Academic advisors: Ernest Rutherford; J. J. Thomson
- Doctoral students: Miles Barnett; Karl George Emeléus
- Other notable students: Charles Oatley; J. A. Ratcliffe

Military service
- Allegiance: United Kingdom
- Branch: Royal Engineers
- Years of service: 1914–1919
- Rank: Captain
- Wars: World War I; Western Front

Sir Edward Victor Appleton (6 September 1892 – 21 April 1965) was a British physicist who received the Nobel Prize in Physics in 1947 for his contributions to the knowledge of the ionosphere, which led to the development of radar and shortwave radio.

A graduate of the University of Cambridge, Appleton was commissioned as a second lieutenant for the Royal Engineers in 1915. During the First World War, he was an instructor at the Royal Engineers Signals Depot in Fenny Stratford, and served briefly on the Western Front. He brought a captured German thermionic valve back with him. He became Wheatstone Professor of Physics at King's College London in 1924 and a fellow of the Royal Society in 1927. His primary research interests were how radio waves were created and propagated and unravelling the mystery of how they were reflected by the upper atmosphere.

Appleton returned to Cambridge in 1936 as Jacksonian Professor of Natural Philosophy and, when Ernest Rutherford died in October of that year, became acting director of the Cavendish Laboratory. In 1939, shortly before the outbreak of the Second World War, Appleton became the Secretary of the Department of Scientific and Industrial Research. In this role, he marshalled the scientific knowledge of Britain in service of the war effort. He was also closely involved with the development of radar, an outgrowth of his pre-war research into the ionosphere. He was also in charge of Tube Alloys, the British nuclear weapons project, which was merged into the American Manhattan Project in 1943.

From 1948 until his death in 1965, he was the Principal and Vice-Chancellor of the University of Edinburgh. As such, he oversaw its growth and was involved in the controversial redevelopment of the historic George Square.

== Early life and education ==
Edward Victor Appleton was born on 6 September 1892 in Bradford, England, the eldest child of Mary (née Wilcock) and Peter Appleton, a clerk who worked in a warehouse of Charles Senior & Co. He had two younger sisters, Isabel and Dorothy. He was named Edward after the tenor Edward Lloyd but preferred to use his middle name; to his family he was always "Vic". He attended Barkerend Primary School until, at the age of 11, he was awarded a scholarship to Hanson Boys' Grammar School, where he was captain of the school cricket and football teams. When he was 16, he won a City of Bradford scholarship to attend Bradford Grammar School but did not take it up.

Appleton sat and passed the London Matriculation Examination but then sat for and won the Isaac Holden Scholarship in 1910. This was a three-year scholarship valued at £150 (equivalent to £15,276 in 2025) that enabled him to enter the University of Cambridge, although he had to wait another year because the university would not admit him until he turned 19. In 1911, he was awarded an exhibition at St John's College, Cambridge, where he obtained a Bachelor of Arts in Natural Science in 1913 and a Master of Arts in Physics in 1914. In 1914, he received the Hutchinson Research Studentship, which enabled him to study under J. J. Thomson and Ernest Rutherford. At Cambridge, he met Sir Oliver Lodge and Guglielmo Marconi, and during the long vacation, he assisted Lawrence Bragg in his work on X-ray crystallography of metals in the Cavendish Laboratory.

== Great War ==
While at Cambridge, Appleton had served in the University Officers' Training Corps. On the outbreak of the First World War in August 1914, Appleton applied for a commission in the Royal Engineers. By September, he had tired of waiting for this and enlisted as a private in the 16th Battalion, West Yorkshire Regiment, also known as the "1st Bradford Pals Battalion". He was soon promoted to corporal. His application for a commission eventually came through, and he was commissioned as a second lieutenant in the Royal Engineers on 9 January 1915. After engineer training at Aldershot, he was sent to Malvern, Worcestershire, for the first general radio course for officers, which was taught by Captain C. F. Trippe, who later played an important role in the industrial development of the thermionic valve. Appleton topped the class on the course examination and was asked to conduct the second course when Trippe fell ill. He was then posted to the Royal Engineers Signals Depot in Fenny Stratford, where he was stationed for the rest of the war.

On 29 May 1915, Appleton married his distant cousin Jessie Longson, the daughter of Reverend John Longson, a Baptist minister. Jessie worked for Lister Mills as a textile designer, creating patterns in silk. After the war they had two daughters: Margery, born in 1920, and Rosalind, born in 1927. Appleton was promoted to the temporary rank of lieutenant on 23 August 1916, and captain on 1 January 1918. Married subalterns were uncommon in those days, and Appleton and Jessie shared a cottage in Fenny Stratford with another lieutenant and his wife.

In 1915, the British Army in France found that its ration parties were being engaged by German artillery, who apparently had intelligence of their activities. The mystery began to unravel after the French captured a German device that was handed over to the British. Appleton and Captains Algernon Fuller and Edward Stevens examined the device and found it consisted of a two-valve amplifier with two pairs of phones and several pairs of terminals. When the terminals were earthed the device could listen in on Army field telephone traffic. The obvious countermeasure was to use twisted pair cabling but this was expensive. After discussion among the three men, Fuller came up with the fullerphone, a device that worked with the existing telephone lines but was far more difficult to tap. In December 1917, Appleton went to the Western Front for a fortnight to demonstrate the use of radios, and he tested the fullerphone in the field, and found that it worked with as little as a micro-ampere of current. He brought a captured German thermionic valve back with him. He was fascinated with the properties of the valve, which he would research on returning to Cambridge. After the war ended, Appleton relinquished his commission on 17 January 1919.

== Between the wars ==
Appleton returned to Cambridge, where he was elected a fellow of St John's College. At first, he was a research student at the Cavendish Laboratory under Thomson, who was succeeded that year by Rutherford. In 1920, Appleton joined the staff of the Cavendish Laboratory as an assistant demonstrator in physics. He was initiated into Freemasonry in 1922. Under Rutherford, the Cavendish Laboratory was drawn deeper into nuclear physics research, but Appleton's interest was exploring radio: the way that radio waves were created by thermionic valves, how they propagated, and the mysterious fluctuations in their reception.

In his investigation of the properties of the thermionic valve, Appleton collaborated with Balthasar van der Pol, a Dutch scientist who had been a fellow research student at the Cavendish Laboratory before the war. Van der Pol considered returning to Cambridge, but Appleton warned him that lectureships paid no more than £250 (equivalent to £25,000 in 2025) per year. Appleton would be reduced to £650 (equivalent to £66,000 in 2025) when his fellowship expired. Van der Pol therefore decided to join Philips instead. Together, they wrote a textbook on the subject, Thermionic Vacuum Tubes, which was published in 1932.

=== Ionosphere ===
In his atmospheric research, Appleton worked with the Radio Research Board, of which he became a member in 1926 and served on until 1939. The Radio Research Board provided him with grants to continue his work and its Radio Research Station at Ditton Park, near Slough, collaborated with the Cavendish Laboratory in its atmospheric research. He also established a field station near Peterborough where his Cavendish Laboratory research student Miles Barnett conducted experiments under his direction. This station moved to Hampstead in 1932. In October 1924, Appleton was appointed Wheatstone Professor of Physics at King's College London. He became a fellow of the Royal Society in 1927.

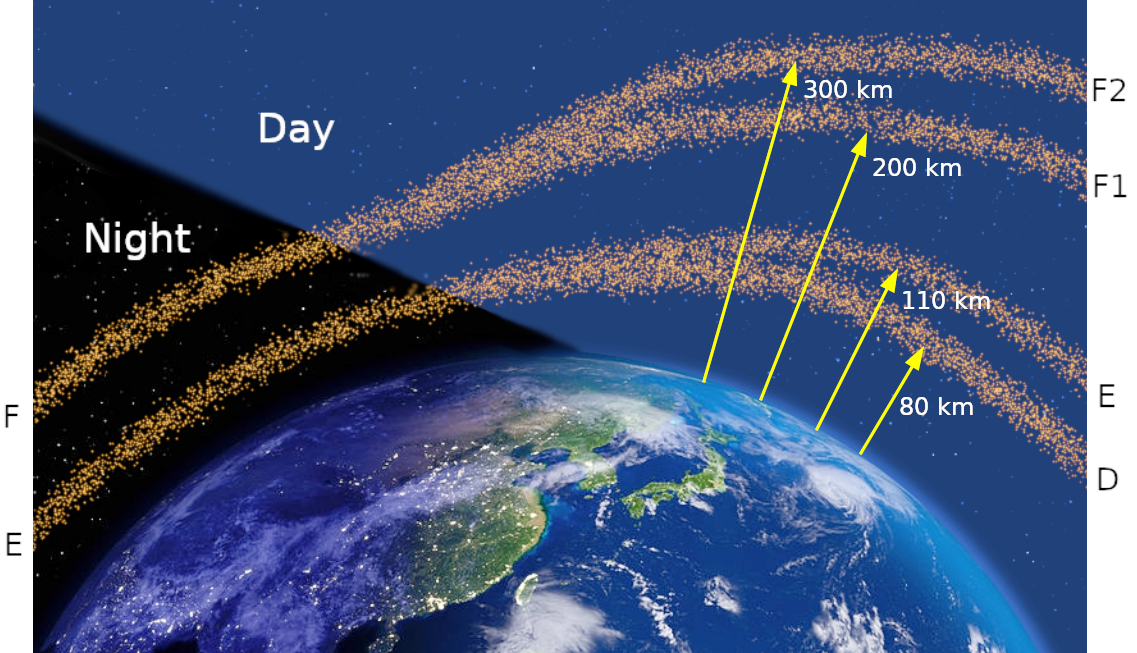
Ionospheric sub-layers from night to day indicating their approximate altitudes (not to scale)

Appleton had observed that the strength of medium wave radio signals was constant during the day but variable at night. He theorised that this was due to a signal bouncing off the upper atmosphere. This would result in two signals being received, which would interfere with each other. The resulting wave interference pattern would account for the variable strength of the signal. The existence of a reflecting atmospheric layer was not in itself a completely new idea; Balfour Stewart had suggested the idea in the late 19th century to explain rhythmic changes in the Earth's magnetic field. More recently, in 1902, Oliver Heaviside and Arthur E. Kennelly had suggested such an electromagnetic-reflecting stratum—now called the Kennelly–Heaviside layer—that may explain the success Marconi had in transmitting his signals across the Atlantic. Calculations had shown that natural bending of the radio waves was not sufficient to stop them from simply "shooting off" into space before they reached the receiver. Appleton thought the best place to look for evidence of the ionosphere was in the variation in the range of radio signal reception that occurred each night around sunset. It was sensible to suggest these variations were due to the interference of two waves but an extra step to show that the second wave causing the interference (the first being the ground wave) was coming down from the ionosphere. The experiment he designed had two methods to show ionospheric influence and both allowed the height of the lower boundary of reflection (thus the lower boundary of the reflecting layer) to be determined. The first method was called frequency modulation (FM) and the second was to calculate the angle of arrival of the reflected signal at the receiving aerial. The FM method exploits the fact that there is a path difference between the ground wave and the reflected wave, meaning they travel different distances from sender to receiver. Let the distance AC travelled by the ground wave be h and the distance ABC travelled by the reflected wave h' . The path difference is:

$h'-h=D$

The wavelength of the transmitted signal is λ. The number of wavelengths difference between the paths h and h' is:

$\frac{h-h'}{\lambda}=\frac{D}{\lambda}=N$

If N is an integer number, then constructive interference will occur, this means a maximum signal will be achieved at the receiving end. If N is an odd integer number of half-wavelengths, then destructive interference will occur and a minimum signal will be received. Let us assume we are receiving a maximum signal for a given wavelength λ. If we start to change λ, this is the process called frequency modulation, N will no longer be a whole number and destructive interference will start to occur, meaning the signal will start to fade. Now we keep changing λ until a maximum signal is once again received. This means that for our new value λ', our new value N' is also an integer number. If we have lengthened λ then we know that N' is one less than N. Thus:

$N-N'=\frac{D}{\lambda}-\frac{D}{\lambda'}=1$

Rearranging for D gives:

$D=h-h'=\frac{1}{\frac{1}{\lambda}-\frac{1}{\lambda'}}$

As we know λ and λ', we can calculate D. Using the approximation that ABC is an isosceles triangle, we can use our value of D to calculate the height of the reflecting layer. This method is a slightly simplified version of the method used by Appleton and his student, Miles Barnett, to work out a first value for the height of the ionosphere in 1924. In their experiment, they used the BBC broadcasting station in Bournemouth to vary the wavelengths of its emissions after the evening programmes had finished. They installed a receiving station in Oxford to monitor the interference effects. The receiving station had to be in Oxford as there was no suitable emitter at the right distance of about 62 miles (100 km) from Cambridge in those days.

Far from being conclusive, the success of the Oxford–Bournemouth experiment revealed a vast new field of study to be explored. It showed that there was indeed a reflecting layer high above the Earth but it also posed many new questions: What was the constitution of this layer? How did it reflect the waves? Was it the same all over the Earth? Why did its effects change so dramatically between day and night? Did it change throughout the year? Appleton would spend the rest of his life answering these questions. He developed a magneto-ionic theory based on the previous work of Lorentz and Maxwell to model the workings of this part of the atmosphere. Using this theory and further experiments, he showed that the so-called Kennelly–Heaviside layer was heavily ionised and thus conducting. This led to the term ionosphere. He showed free electrons to be the ionising agents. He discovered that the layer could be penetrated by waves above a certain frequency and that this critical frequency could be used to calculate the electron density in the layer. However, these penetrating waves would also be reflected back, but from a much higher layer. This showed the ionosphere had a much more complex structure than first anticipated. The lower level was labelled "E layer," which reflected longer wavelengths and was found to be at approximately 100 kilometres (62 mi). The high level—which had much higher electron density—was labelled "F layer," and could reflect much shorter wavelengths that penetrated the lower layer. It is situated 300 to 400 kilometres (190 to 250 mi) above the Earth's surface. It is this, which is often referred to as the Appleton layer, that is responsible for enabling most long range shortwave telecommunication.

The magneto-ionic theory also allowed Appleton to explain the origin of the mysterious fadings heard on the radio around sunset. During the day, the light from the Sun causes the molecules in the air to become ionised even at fairly low altitudes. At these low altitudes, the density of the air is great and thus the electron density of ionised air is very large. Due to this heavy ionisation, there is strong absorption of electromagnetic waves caused by "electron friction". Thus, in transmissions over any distance, there will be no reflections as any waves apart from the one at ground level will be absorbed rather than reflected. However, when the sun sets, the molecules slowly start to recombine with their electrons and the free electron density levels drop. This means absorption rates diminish and waves can be reflected with sufficient strengths to be noticed, leading to the interference phenomena we have mentioned. For these interference patterns to occur though, there must not simply be the presence of a reflected wave but a change in the reflected wave. Otherwise, the interference is constant and fadings would not be heard. The received signal would simply be louder or softer than during the day. This suggests the height at which reflection happens must slowly change as the sun sets. Appleton found in fact that it increased as the sun set and then decreased as the sun rose until the reflected wave was too weak to record. This variation is compatible with the theory that ionisation is due to the Sun's influence. At sunset, the intensity of the Sun's radiation will be much less at the surface of the Earth than it is high up in the atmosphere. This means ionic recombination will progress slowly from lower altitudes to higher ones and therefore the height at which waves are reflected slowly increases as the sun sets.

Appleton devoted almost all of his scientific career to the study of the ionosphere. Like many other fields, it grew in intricacy the more it was studied. By the end of his life, ionospheric observatories had been set up all over the world to provide a global map of the reflecting layers. Links were found to the 11-year sunspot cycle and the aurora borealis, the magnetic storms that occur in high latitudes. This became particularly relevant during the Second World War when the storms would lead to radio blackouts. Thanks to Appleton's research, the periods when these would occur could be predicted and communication could be switched to wavelengths that would be least affected. Radar, another crucial wartime innovation, was one that came about thanks to Appleton's work. On a very general level, his research consisted in determining the distance of reflecting objects from radio signal transmitters. This is exactly the idea of radar and the flashing dots that appear on the screen (a cathode ray tube) scanned by the circulating 'searcher' bar. This system was developed partly by Appleton as a new method, called the pulse method, to make ionospheric measurements. It was later adapted by Robert Watson-Watt to detect aeroplanes.

Appleton returned to Cambridge in 1936 as Jacksonian Professor of Natural Philosophy and was re-elected as a fellow of St John's College. He brought several of his research students with him, including William Roy Piggott, and persuaded the university to build him a new field laboratory. When Rutherford died in October of that year, Appleton became acting director of the Cavendish Laboratory. Although he hoped to succeed Rutherford, in the summer of 1938 it was announced that Lawrence Bragg would become the next director instead.

== Second World War ==
In October 1938, the Secretary of the Department of Scientific and Industrial Research (DSIR), Sir Frank Edward Smith, retired, and the British government appointed Appleton as his successor. Another major war was imminent, and preparations were already underway in the department. In February 1939, he moved with his family to Putney in London. Soon after the outbreak of the Second World War in September, he had Piggott brought from Cambridge as his assistant. The many laboratories assisted the war effort in diverse ways: National Physical Laboratory's ship tank was used to develop landing craft, the Mulberry harbours and the bouncing bomb; the Forest Products Research Laboratory developed plywood and adhesives for use in aircraft; the Fuel Research Station developed fuel for flame throwers; and the Water Pollution Research Laboratory created a device for airmen to make sea water into drinking water. He was also closely involved with the development of radar, and his pre-war research into the ionosphere also found a role in high-frequency direction finding.

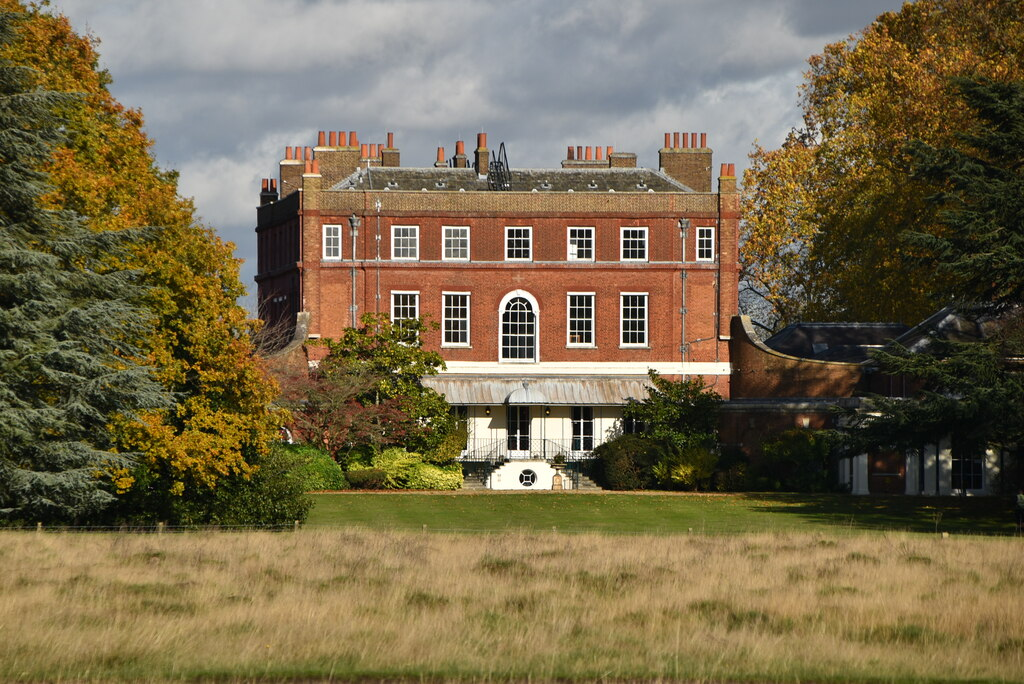
Bushy House in Teddington

Appleton's home in Putney was damaged in the Blitz in September 1940, and the family, now reduced to three after Rosalind married William Lamont, a Church of England minister who joined the Royal Navy in 1941, moved to the Clarence Hotel in Teddington, near where DSIR headquarters had relocated to the Chemical Research Laboratory in Teddington and the National Physical Laboratory in Bushy Park. The latter was targeted by German bombers, and the family spent nights in the air raid shelter under the hotel. In 1942, the National Physical Laboratory's director, Sir Charles Galton Darwin was seconded to the British Mission in Washington, DC. Appleton became acting director in addition to his role as Secretary of the DSIR and the family moved into Bushy House. He was created a Knight Commander of the Order of the Bath, an honour customarily conferred on the Secretary of the DSIR, in the 1941 New Year Honours.

In September 1941, Appleton picked up another responsibility when the directorate of Tube Alloys was established as part of DSIR. The name was deliberately chosen to be meaningless. The directorate was responsible for the development of nuclear weapons. Sir John Anderson, who, as Lord President of the Council, was the minister responsible for DSIR, appointed Wallace Akers, the research director of Imperial Chemical Industries (ICI), as the director of Tube Alloys. An advisory committee known as the Tube Alloys Consultative Council was created to oversee its work and handle policy matters, chaired by Anderson, with its other members being Appleton, Lord Hankey, Lord Cherwell and Sir Henry Dale. One of Appleton's first actions was to have Charles Findlay Davidson conduct a search for sources of uranium.

The Quebec Agreement in August 1943 merged Tube Alloys with the American Manhattan Project. Anderson had intended that Akers would be the British representative, but the Americans considered him a persona non grata due to his commercial background. Anderson sent Appleton to Washington to negotiate a deal. When he arrived, he found that Colonel John Llewellin, the British Minister of State for Supply in the United States, had appointed James Chadwick as interim head of the British mission to the Manhattan Project. Appleton supported this appointment and convinced Anderson to make the appointment permanent. This left only a residual Tube Alloys directorate in the UK under Akers, but in April 1945, Appleton recommended that John Cockcroft be appointed to set up an Atomic Energy Research Establishment in the UK, thereby laying the groundwork for the British post-war nuclear weapons project.

This was but one aspect of post-war reconstruction planning that Appleton reoriented DSIR towards in the last years of the war. He foresaw the need for science and industry to collaborate in rebuilding a nation where services and infrastructure had been damaged and dislocated by the war. To inform the public about the part DSIR had played in the war, he commissioned a book, Science at War (1947), by James Crowther and Richard Whiddington. He was created a Knight Grand Cross of the Order of the British Empire in the 1946 New Year Honours. He also received foreign awards, including the Medal for Merit from the United States, the Legion of Honour from France and the King Haakon VII Freedom Cross from Norway. He was made a Commander of the Norwegian Order of Saint Olav and a Knight Commander of the Icelandic Order of the Falcon. The highest honour though was the award of the Nobel Prize in Physics in 1947 "for his investigations of the physics of the upper atmosphere especially for the discovery of the so-called Appleton layer."

== Later life ==
=== University of Edinburgh ===
In October 1948, the Lord Provost of Edinburgh, Sir Andrew Murray, invited Appleton to become the Principal and Vice-Chancellor of the University of Edinburgh, a position that had been vacant since the death of Sir John Fraser in December 1947. Appleton and Lady Appleton were reluctant owing to the poor state of the proposed Principal's residence, Abden House, but the Lord Provost agreed to renovate it, and Appleton formally assumed the position in May 1949. In 1952, Helen Allison, a former Women's Royal Naval Service officer, became his private secretary.

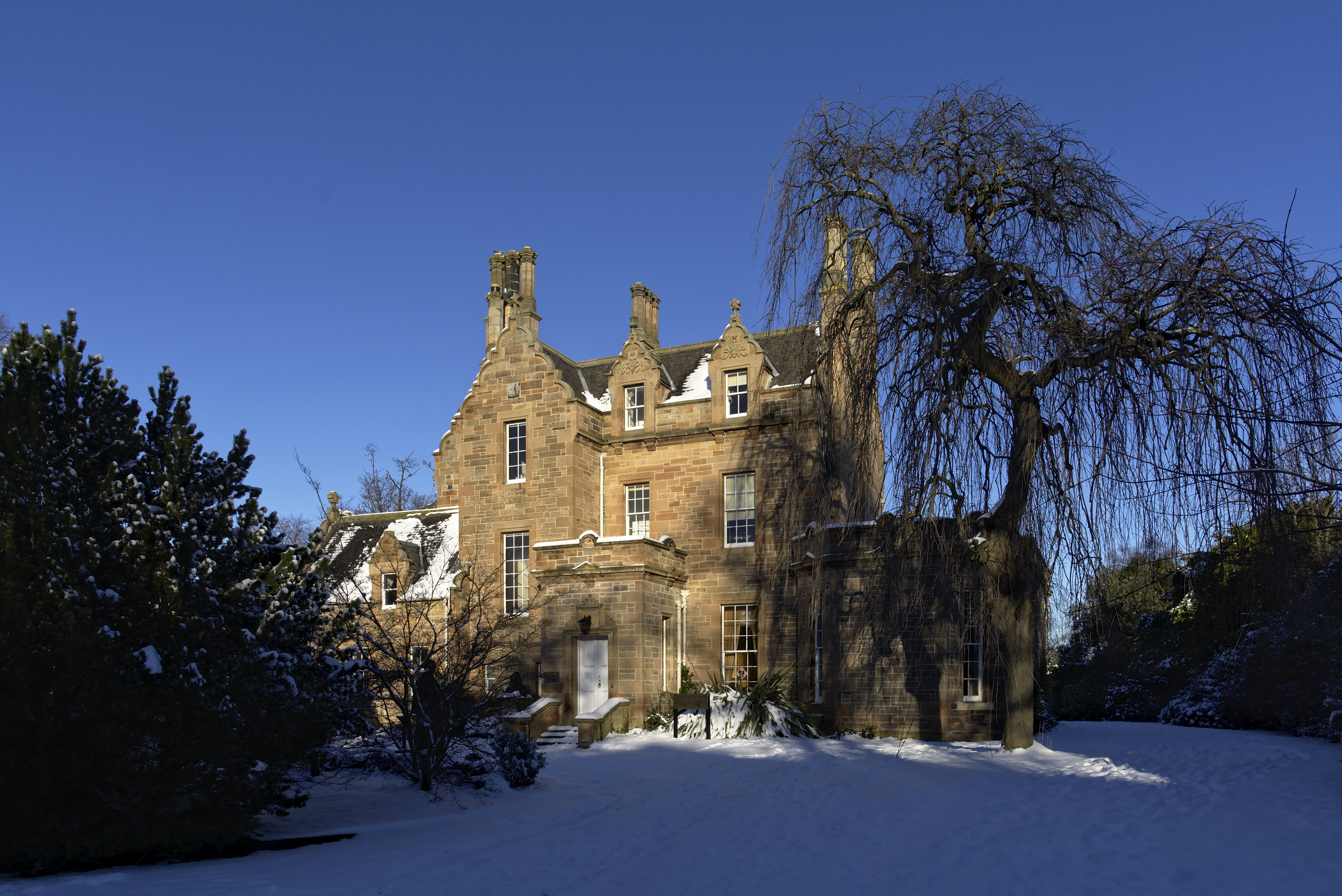
Abden House, Edinburgh

Appleton's major task was managing the expansion of the university, which grew from 185 full-time staff and 3,716 students in 1939 to 612 full-time staff and 7,004 students twenty years later. Overcrowding was evident even in 1939, and a master plan called for the redevelopment of George Square, a historic district that had long since fallen on hard times, into a university precinct. The first step, an extension of the existing medical buildings, was approved by the Edinburgh Town Council in February 1949, shortly before Appleton arrived. This involved the demolition of much of the area's historic houses and erecting modern buildings such as 40 George Square, the Edinburgh University Library and what became Appleton Tower. This was highly controversial and bitterly contested. Instead of sending form letters to those who wrote to him to process, Appleton wrote personal letters addressing the issues the sender raised. He lived to see the project carried through.

Appleton retained his interest in the physics of the ionosphere. He started the Journal of Atmospheric and Terrestrial Physics in 1950 and remained its editor-in-chief until his death in 1965. He was president of the International Union of Scientific Radio (URSI) from 1934 to 1952, and attended its general assemblies in Zurich in 1950, Sydney in 1952, The Hague in 1954 and Boulder, Colorado, in 1957. On the trip to Australia in 1952, he addressed audiences in Sydney, Canberra and Adelaide. In 1954, he noticed that values for the F_{2}-Layer differed between Delhi and Baton Rouge. It was already known that the northern hemisphere differed from the southern, but these cities are on similar latitudes. He realised that what was important was latitude in relation to Magnetic equator and the geographic one. In 1956, the BBC invited Appleton to deliver the annual Reith Lectures. Across a series of six radio broadcasts, titled Science and the Nation, he explored the many facets of scientific activity in Britain at the time.

The philosopher George Elder Davie claimed that he had been rebuked by Appleton for the implicit criticism of academic specialism in his influential book The Democratic Intellect (1961), which championed Scotland's generalist intellectual tradition.

=== Death ===
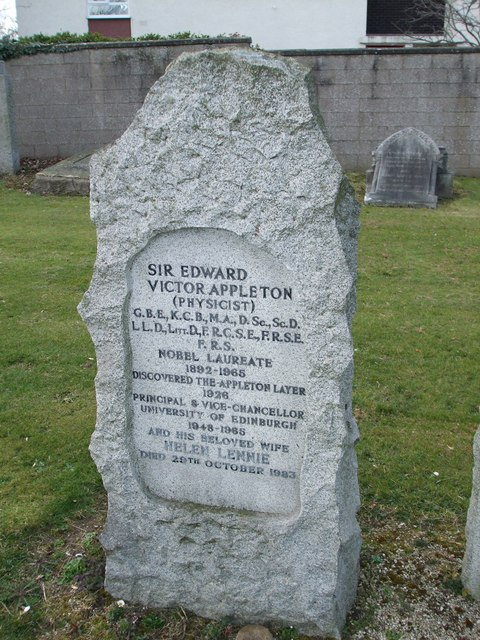
Appleton's grave in Morningside Cemetery, Edinburgh

Lady (Jessie) Appleton had a severe stroke in 1961, and she died in 1964. On 24 March 1965, Appleton married Helen Allison. He died from a sudden heart attack on 21 April that year at Abden House. He is buried in Edinburgh's Morningside Cemetery with Helen. His papers are held by the University of Edinburgh; the University of Cambridge holds his correspondence with J. A. Ratcliffe.

== Recognition ==
=== Memberships ===
Year	Organisation	Type	Ref.
1927	Royal Society	Fellow	
1936	American Academy of Arts and Sciences	International Honorary Member	
1947	Royal Society of Edinburgh	Honorary Fellow	
1948	Pontifical Academy of Sciences	Academician	

=== Awards ===
Year	Organisation	Award	Citation	Ref.
1929	Institute of Radio Engineers	Morris Liebmann Memorial Prize	"For his investigations in the field of wave propagation."	
1933	Royal Society	Hughes Medal	"For his researches into the effect of the Heaviside layer upon the transmission of wireless signals."	
1946	Institution of Electrical Engineers	Faraday Medal	—	
1947	Royal Swedish Academy of Sciences	Nobel Prize in Physics	"For his investigations of the physics of the upper atmosphere especially for the discovery of the so-called Appleton layer."	
1947	Institute of Physics	Chree Medal and Prize	—	
1948	Danish Academy of Technical Sciences	Valdemar Poulsen Gold Medal	"For outstanding contributions to radio technics and particularly for remarkable achievement in research on the ionosphere."	
1950	Royal Society	Royal Medal	"For his work on the ele [sic] transmission of electromagnetic waves round the earth and for his investigations of the ionic state of the upper atmosphere."	
1950	Royal Society of Arts	Albert Medal	—	
1962	Institute of Radio Engineers	IRE Medal of Honor	"For his distinguished pioneer work in investigating the ionosphere by means of radio waves."	

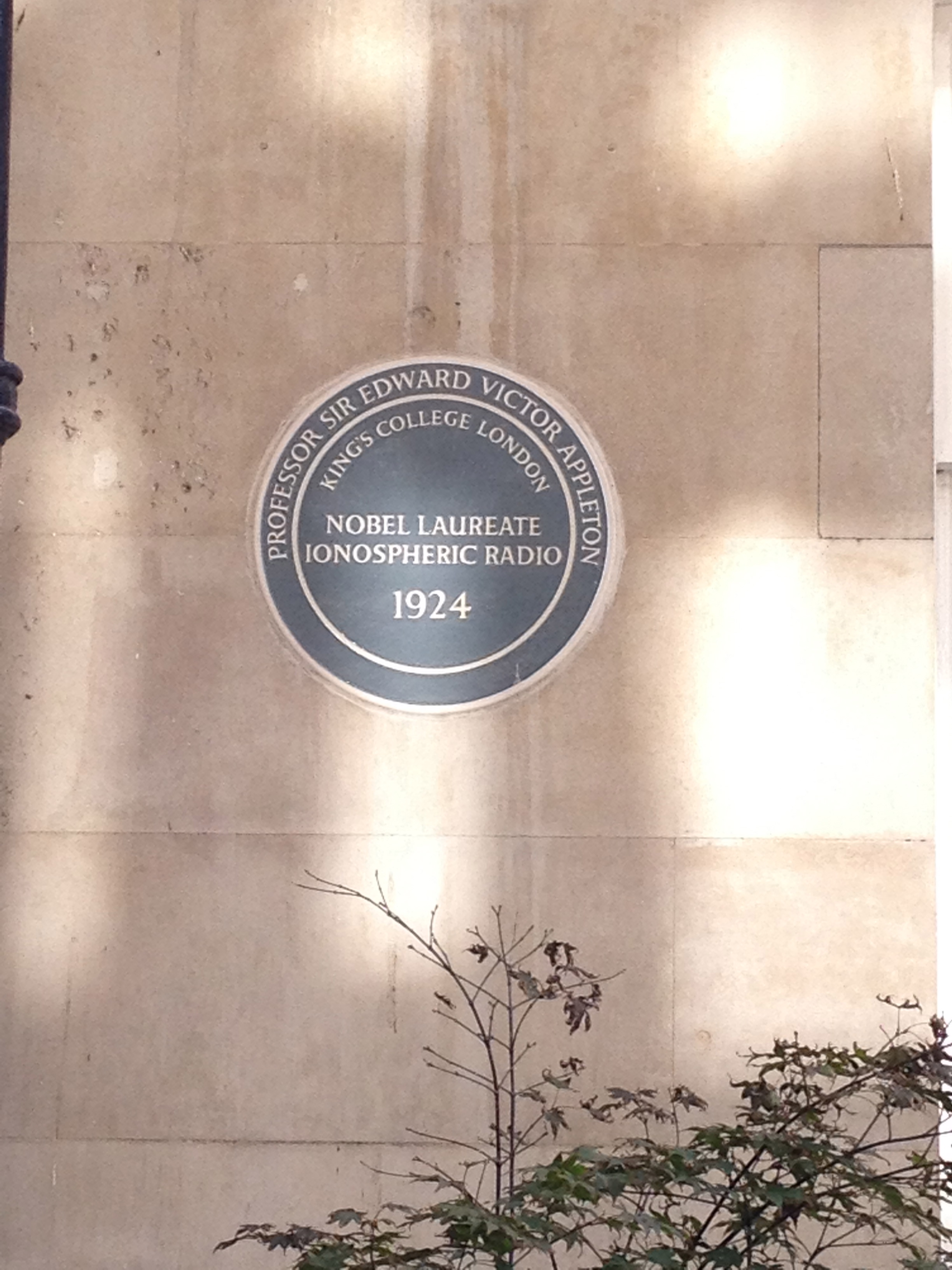
Nobel Laureate plaque at King's College London Strand Campus

=== Honours ===
Year	Country	Honour	Ref.
1941	United Kingdom	Knight Commander of the Order of the Bath	
1946	United Kingdom	Knight Grand Cross of the Order of the British Empire	

== Commemoration ==
In 1973, the Radio Research Station was renamed the Appleton Laboratory. In 1979, it merged with the Rutherford Laboratory to become the Rutherford Appleton Laboratory. In 2008, the Institute of Physics' Chree Medal and Prize (of which Appleton was a recipient) was renamed the Edward Appleton Medal and Prize. Appleton Tower at the University of Edinburgh, Appleton crater on the Moon, and Appleton Academy in Bradford are also named after him.

== See also ==
- Journal of Atmospheric and Terrestrial Physics, founded by Appleton
- Appleton–Hartree equation

== Notes ==
Academic offices
Preceded by C. T. R. Wilson	Jacksonian Professor of Natural Philosophy; 1936–1939	Succeeded by John Cockcroft
Preceded by Sir John Fraser	Principal of the University of Edinburgh; 1949–1965	Succeeded by Michael Swann
Government offices
Preceded by Sir Frank Smith	Secretary of the Department of Scientific and Industrial Research; 1939–1948	Succeeded by Sir Ben Lockspeiser
