= Clarence =

Clarence may refer to:

== People ==
- Clarence (given name)
- Clarence (surname)

== Places ==
=== Australia ===
- Clarence County, New South Wales, a cadastral division
- Clarence, New South Wales, a place near Lithgow
- Clarence Town, New South Wales, a locality and township
- Clarence River (New South Wales)
- Clarence Strait (Northern Territory)
- City of Clarence, a local government body and municipality in Tasmania
- Clarence, Western Australia, an early settlement
- Electoral district of Clarence, an electoral district in the New South Wales Legislative Assembly

=== Canada ===
- Clarence, Ontario, a hamlet in the city of Clarence-Rockland
- Clarence Township, Ontario
- Clarence, Nova Scotia, a community
- Clarence Islands, Nunavut, Canada
- Clarence River (Alaska–Yukon)

=== New Zealand ===
- Clarence, New Zealand, a small town in North Canterbury
- Waiau Toa / Clarence River

=== United States ===
- Clarence Strait, Alaska
- Clarence, Illinois, an unincorporated community
- Clarence, Iowa, a city
- Clarence Township, Barton County, Kansas
- Clarence, Louisiana, a village
- Clarence Township, Michigan
- Clarence, Missouri, a city
- Clarence, New York, a town
  - Clarence (CDP), New York, a census-designated place in the town
- Clarence, Pennsylvania, a census-designated place
- Clarence, Wisconsin, a ghost town
- Clarence River (Alaska–Yukon)

=== Elsewhere ===
- Clarence Island (South Shetland Islands), Antarctica
- Clarence Town, Bahamas
- Clarence Island, Chile
- Clarence City or Port Clarence (Fernando Po), Equatorial Guinea, former name of Malabo
- Clarence (river), France
- Clarence Strait (Iran)
- Clare, Suffolk, England, which gave its name to the Dukedom of Clarence

== Arts and entertainment ==
- Clarence (play), by Booth Tarkington
- Clarence (1922 film), based on the play, starring Wallace Reid, Agnes Ayres
- Clarence (1937 film), based on the play
- Clarence (1990 film), a spin-off film/sequel to It's a Wonderful Life
  - Clarence Odbody, the guardian angel from the 1946 film It's a Wonderful Life
- Clarence "Clay" Morrow, a character in the TV series Sons of Anarchy
- Clarence Royce, a character in the TV series The Wire
- Clarence, star of 1965 film Clarence, the Cross-Eyed Lion which was the basis for the 1966 TV show Daktari
- Clarence, the protagonist in the 2023 American biblical comedy-drama film The Book of Clarence
- Clarence, a ghost character in the animated series Adventure Time
- Clarence (British TV series), a British sitcom starring Ronnie Barker that aired on BBC
- Clarence (American TV series), an American animated series that airs on Cartoon Network
- Clarence (Wonder Showzen), a puppet from the television series Wonder Showzen
- Clarence, a 2001 novel by Henry Denker
- Clarence, an 1830 novel by Catharine Sedgwick

== Military ==
- HMS Clarence, three ships of the Royal Navy
- CSS Clarence, a Confederate States Navy commerce raider
- Fort Clarence, Rochester, Kent, England, a former fortification
- Fort Clarence (Nova Scotia), a former British fortification built in 1754
- Clarence Barracks, a former military installation at Portsmouth, Hampshire, England

== Sports ==
- Clarence F.C., a former football club based in Belfast, Northern Ireland
- Clarence F.C. (England), a former football club based in Battersea
- Clarence Football Club, an Australian rules football team based in Bellerive, Tasmania
- Clarence United FC, a former amateur soccer club based in the City of Clarence, Tasmania
- Clarence Zebras FC, a soccer club based in the City of Clarence

== Schools ==
- Clarence High School (Bellerive, Tasmania), Australia
- Clarence High School (India), Bangalore, Karnataka
- Clarence High School (Clarence, New York), United States

== Transportation ==
- Clarence (carriage), a type of horse-drawn carriage
- Clarence Railway, a 19th century railway in north-east England
- Clarence railway station, New South Wales, Australia
- Clarence Street, Sydney, Australia

== Other uses ==
- Duke of Clarence, a title which has been traditionally awarded to members of the English and British royal families
- Clarence Club, a former gentlemen's club in Mayfair, London
- Clarence Correctional Centre, a prison in New South Wales, Australia
- Clarence Dock, Liverpool, a former dock on the River Mersey, England
- Clarence Hotel, the name of several hotels and public houses
- Clarence Pier, an amusement pier in Portsmouth, Hampshire

== See also ==
- Clarence House (disambiguation)
- Port Clarence (disambiguation)
- Clarence Drive, a mountain pass in West Cape, South Africa
- Clarens (disambiguation)
