= J. A. Ratcliffe =

British radio physicist (1902–1987)

John Ashworth Ratcliffe
- John Ashworth Ratcliffe, FRS © National Portrait Gallery, London
- Born: 12 December 1902; Bacup, England
- Died: 25 October 1987 (aged 84); Cambridge, England
- Education: Sidney Sussex College, Cambridge
- Known for: Ionospheric physics
- Spouse: Nora Disley
- Children: 2
- Awards: See list
- Scientific career
- Fields: Radio physics
- Workplaces: University of Cambridge; TRE in Dundee; Radio Research Station
- Academic advisors: Edward Appleton
- Doctoral students: Basil Briggs; Maurice Wilkes; Joseph Lade Pawsey; Ronald N. Bracewell; Henry G. Booker
- Other notable students: Martin Ryle

John Ashworth Ratcliffe CB CBE FRS (known to intimates as "Jar"; 12 December 1902 – 25 October 1987) was an influential British radio physicist. (Several sources misspell his name as Radcliffe.)

== Biography ==
Ratcliffe was born in Bacup, the elder son of Harry Heys Ratcliffe, a partner in the stone quarrying firm of Henry Heys and Co., and Beatrice Alice. daughter of Richard Ashworth, founder of the firm of Mitchells, Ashworth, Stansfield and Co.

He was educated at Bacup and Rawtenstall Secondary School (1912–1924), Heversham Grammar School (1914–19) and Giggleswick School (1919–1921). In 1921 he entered Sidney Sussex College, Cambridge and graduated in natural sciences with first-class honours in 1924.

That year Ratcliffe started research on radio wave propagation under Edward Appleton. They and M A F Barnett developed methods to understand why ‘fading’ of radio signals from a fixed transmitter occurred during hour of darkness. In 1927 Ratcliffe was made head of a group in the Cavendish Laboratory known as the radio ionosphere research group. They studied how radio waves were reflected from the ionized layer in the upper atmosphere (previously called the Heaviside layer), and how the layer was formed. The work of the group and their publications are described at some length in the Royal Society’s biographical memoir.

At the outbreak of war in 1939, dozens of radar stations formed a network, known as Chain Home (CH), covering the eastern and southern coasts of Britain. Physicists from the Cavendish and elsewhere were assigned to spend a month at one of the stations: Ratcliffe was sent to the one near Dover, but was soon made part of the Telecommunications Research Establishment (TRE) in Dundee where he was in charge of a new form of CH known as Chain Home Low (CHL), used to detect aircraft flying at altitudes below those detectable by CH stations. His work took him to various locations during the war: Swanage, Petersham, back to Dundee, and Malvern.

At the end of the conflict, Ratcliffe was back at the Cavendish, which had been enlarged, enabling him to restart research with a larger group. Martin Ryle and some others from TRE joined them and decided to follow up the discovery of radio emission from the sun. Ryle was in charge of a section concerned with radio astronomy.

In October 1960 Ratcliffe left Cambridge to take up the post of director of the Radio Research Station at Ditton Park. He resigned in 1966.

=== Family ===
John Ratcliffe married Nora Disley at St Nicholas Church, Newchurch on 28 August 1930. They had two daughters, Margaret and Elizabeth. Elizabeth died in 1966, and Nora in 1977.

Ratcliffe died at his home, 193 Huntingdon Road, Cambridge, on 25 October 1987.

== Honours and awards ==
- 1946 Awarded OBE
- 1950 Ambrose Fleming Premium, IEE
- 1951 Fellow of the Royal Society
- 1952 Duddell Premium, IEE
- 1953 Fellow of the Institute of Radio Engineers, USA
- 1953 The Holweck medal and prize (jointly with Société Française de Physique)
- 1953 Invited to deliver the Royal Institution Christmas Lecture on The Uses of Radio Waves
- 1958 President of the Physical Society
- 1959 Awarded CBE
- 1962 Honorary Fellow, Sidney Sussex College, Cambridge
- 1965 Appointed CB
- 1965 Vice President, Institute of Electrical and Electronics Engineers, USA
- 1966 Royal Medal, the Royal Society
- 1966 President, IEE
- 1966 Faraday Medal
- 1966 Honorary President, International Union of Radio Science (URSI)
- 1971 Guthrie Medal and Prize, Institute of Physics
- 1972 Honorary Fellow, Institute of Physics
- 1973 Fellow, American Geophysical Union
- 1976 Gold Medal, Royal Astronomical Society
- 1977 Honorary Fellow, IEE
- 1979 DSc honoris causa, University of Kent at Canterbury
- 1981 Fellow, Indian National Science Academy
