= Ralph Winwood =

English diplomat and statesman

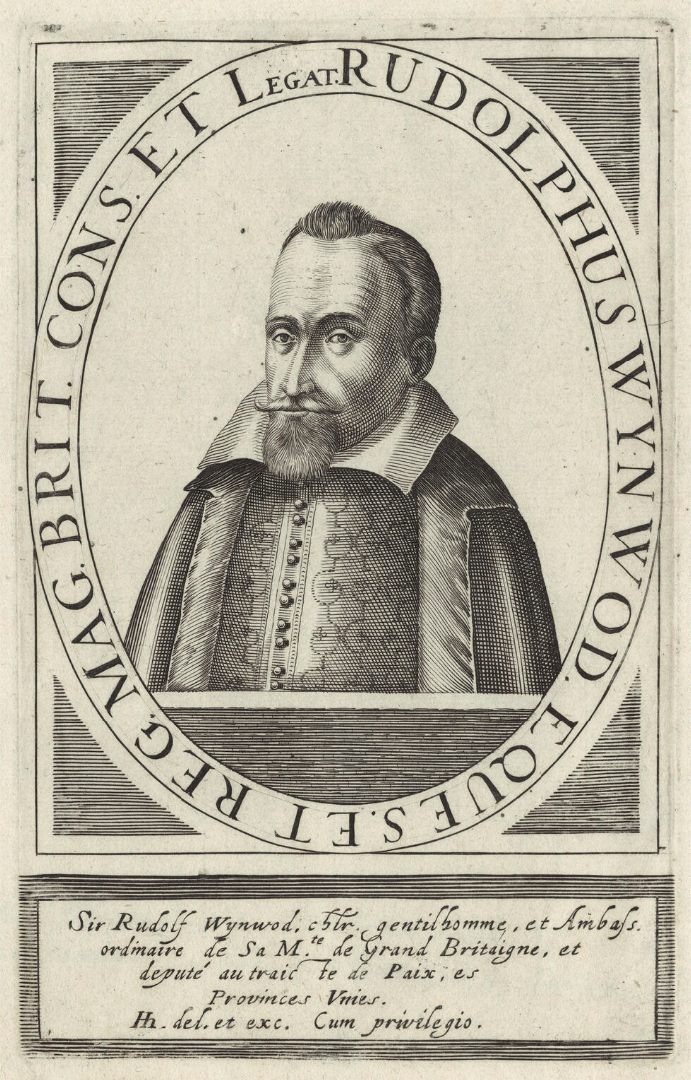
Early 17th-century engraving of Sir Ralph Winwood, by Hendrik Hondius I.

Sir Ralph Winwood (c. 1563 – 27 October 1617) was an English diplomat and statesman to the Jacobean court.

== Early life ==
Ralph Winwood was born the son of Richard Winwood at Aynhoe in Northamptonshire. A 'hot puritan', according to a Jesuit reporter, he was educated at St John's College, Oxford (1577), Magdalen College, Oxford (1582). To conclude his education, he travelled to Italy, where he enrolled at the University of Padua (1594).

== Career ==
Pursuing a career as a diplomat, Winwood became secretary to Sir Henry Neville (c. 1562-1615), the English ambassador in France, in 1599 and he succeeded Neville in this position two years later, retaining it until 1603. He was Clerk of Privy Council (extraordinary) from 1603 to 1608, and (ordinary) from 1608 to 1609. In 1603 Winwood was sent to The Hague as agent to the States-General of the United Provinces, and was appointed a member of the Dutch council of state on the basis of the Treaty of Nonsuch. Winwood's hearty dislike of Spain coloured all his actions in Holland; he was anxious to see a continuance of the war between Spain and the United Netherlands, and expressed both his own views and those of the English government at the time when he wrote, "how convenient this war would be for the good of His Majesty's realms, if it might be maintained without his charge." He was knighted on 28 June 1607.

In June 1608, Winwood signed the league between England and the United Provinces. Shortly afterwards, he became the first accredited English ambassador to the Dutch Republic. He was in Holland when the trouble over the succession to the duchies of Jülich and Cleves threatened to cause a European war. In this matter, he negotiated with the Protestant Princes of Germany on behalf of King James I of England. As ambassador, Winwood publicly intervened in the Vorstius affair, and secretly sided with the Contra-Remonstrants in the religious conflicts that engulfed the United Provinces during and after his embassy. While in Holland he obtained greyhounds for Anne of Denmark from Jacob van den Eynde, Governor of Woerden. He was appointed Master of Requests from 1609 to 1614.

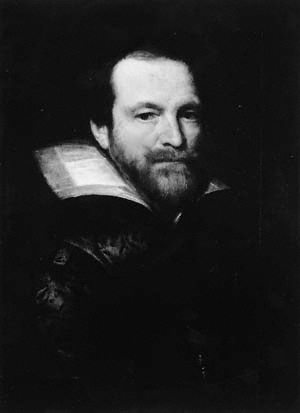
Portrait of Sir Ralph Winwood by Abraham van Blyenberch, 1613.

Having returned to England Sir Ralph became secretary of state and Privy Councillor from 1614 until his death and a Member of Parliament (MP) for Buckingham.

In the House of Commons he defended the king's right to levy impositions. Created principal Secretary of state on Somerset's demise, Winwood held the office from March 1614 to his death during the Addled Parliament. Winwood was responsible for the inquiry into the murder of Sir Thomas Overbury and the release of Raleigh from the Tower in 1616. Raleigh was urged by Winwood to attack the Spanish fleet and the Spanish settlements in South America.

Spanish envoys at Court of St James's made several written complaints about the secretary's share in this undertaking to the king at Whitehall Palace. In the midst of this latest foreign policy crisis, Sir Ralph Winwood died in London on 28 October 1617. It can hardly be doubted, wrote Gardiner, that, if he had lived till the following summer, he would have shared in Raleigh's ruin.

== Marriage ==
Ralph Winwood married Elizabeth Ball, daughter of Nicholas Ball of Totnes, Devon, by whom he had five sons (2 of whom predeceased him) and four daughters. One of Winwood's daughters, Anne Winwood (d. 1643), married Edward Montagu, 2nd Baron Montagu of Boughton, and their son was Ralph Montagu, 1st Duke of Montagu.

== Ditton House ==
Winwood acquired the park and manor of Ditton at Stoke Poges. John Chamberlain described improvements at Ditton Park in August 1617 made by Winwood and his wife, including a new dovecote, a spring and conduit, fair ponds, damming and filling in the old moat, planting an orchard, and setting out a walled garden with arbours.

== Sources ==
- Gardiner, Stephen.R. (1904–1907). History of England. Vol. ii. and iii.
- Lee, Sidney, ed. (1891). "Winwood, Ralph" . Dictionary of National Biography. Vol. 28. London: Smith, Elder & Co.
- Greengrass, M. "Winwood, Sir Ralph (1562/3–1617)". Oxford Dictionary of National Biography (online ed.). Oxford University Press. doi:10.1093/ref:odnb/29783. (Subscription, Wikipedia Library access or UK public library membership required.)

Diplomatic posts
Preceded by George Gilpin as English Councillor on the Dutch Council of State	English agent then ambassador to the United Provinces; 1603–1613; With: Sir Richard Spencer as Joint Commissioner 1607–1609	Succeeded by Sir Henry Wotton
Government offices
Preceded by Robert Carr, Lord Rochester; John Herbert	Secretary of State; 1614–1617; With: John Herbert 1614–1616; Sir Thomas Lake 1616–1617	Succeeded by Sir Robert Naunton; Sir Thomas Lake
