= Journal of Atmospheric and Solar-Terrestrial Physics =

- Discipline: Atmospheric sciences, solar-terrestrial physics
- Language: English
- Edited by: Professor Costas Varotsos

Publication details
- Former names: Journal of Atmospheric and Terrestrial Physics
- History: 1950-present
- Publisher: Elsevier, sponsored by the International Union of Radio Science
- Frequency: Monthly
- Impact factor: 2.119 (2021)

Standard abbreviations
- ISO 4: J. Atmos. Sol.-Terr. Phys.

Indexing
- CODEN: JASPF3
- ISSN: 1364-6826
- LCCN: 97659018
- OCLC no.: 423798896

Links
- Journal homepage; Online archive

The Journal of Atmospheric and Solar-Terrestrial Physics is a monthly peer-reviewed scientific journal covering the atmospheric and solar-terrestrial physics. It was established in 1950 as the Journal of Atmospheric and Terrestrial Physics, obtaining its current name in 1997. It is published by Elsevier and sponsored by the International Union of Radio Science. According to the Journal Citation Reports, the journal has a 2021 impact factor of 2.119. Its founding editor was Edward Victor Appleton, and the current editor-in-chief is Costas Varotsos.
