= Clarance =

Clarance is both a given name and a surname.

Notable people with the given name include:

- Clarance Holt (1826–1903), English actor-manager

Notable people with the surname include:

- Elijah Clarance (born 1998), Swedish basketball player

== See also ==
- Clarence (disambiguation)
