= 1945 Birthday Honours (New Zealand) =

Awards list for New Zealand

The 1945 King's Birthday Honours in New Zealand, celebrating the official birthday of King George VI, were appointments made by the King to various orders and honours. The awards were made in recognition of war service by New Zealanders and were announced on 14 June 1945. No civilian awards were made.

The recipients of honours are displayed here as they were styled before their new honour.

== Order of the Bath ==
=== Companion (CB) ===
Military division, additional

- Brigadier (temporary) Albert Edward Conway OBE – New Zealand Staff Corps; of Wellington.
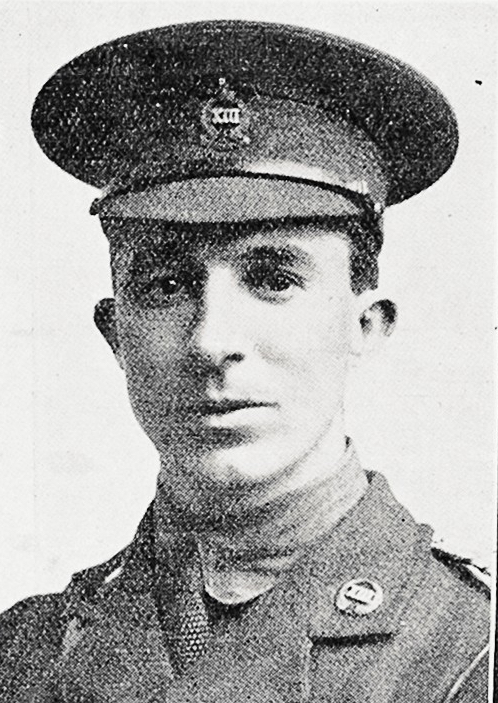
Albert Conway

== Order of the British Empire ==
=== Commander (CBE) ===
Military division, additional

- Acting Air Commodore Ronald Burns Bannerman DFC* – Royal New Zealand Air Force; of Wellington.
- Acting Air Commodore Hector Douglas McGregor DSO – Royal Air Force; of Napier.
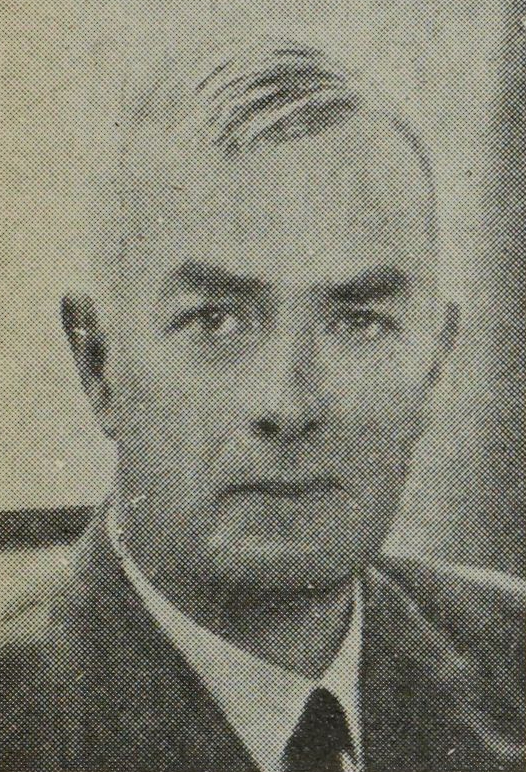
Ronald Bannerman

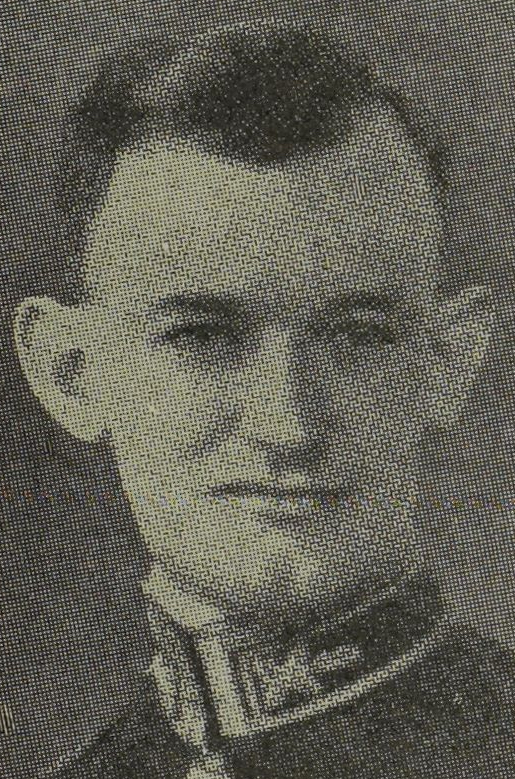
Hector McGregor

=== Officer (OBE) ===
Military division, additional

- Wing Commander Miles Aylmer Fulton Barnett – Royal New Zealand Air Force; of Wellington.
- Lieutenant-Colonel Henry Morton Foster – New Zealand Staff Corps; of Auckland.
- Lieutenant-Colonel Frederick William Kemp MC ED – New Zealand Medical Corps; of Upper Hutt.
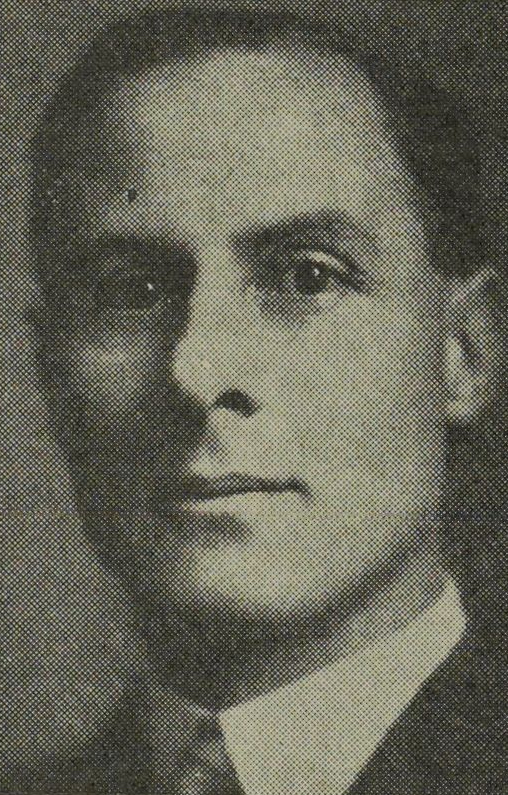
Miles Barnett

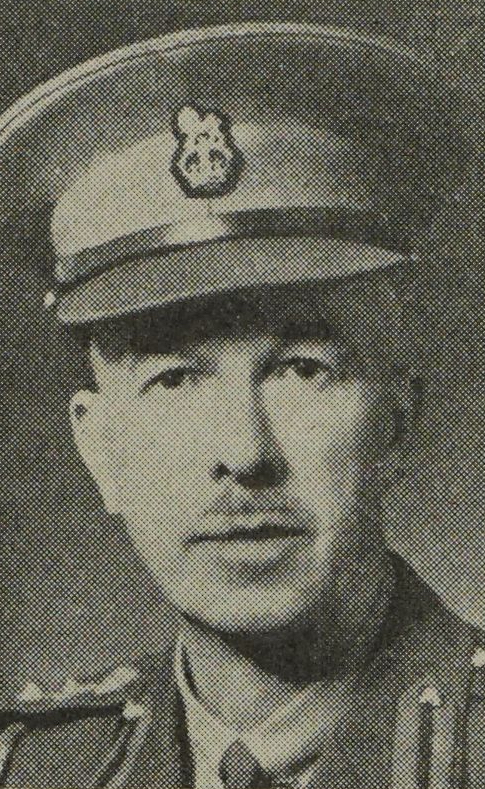
Henry Morton Foster

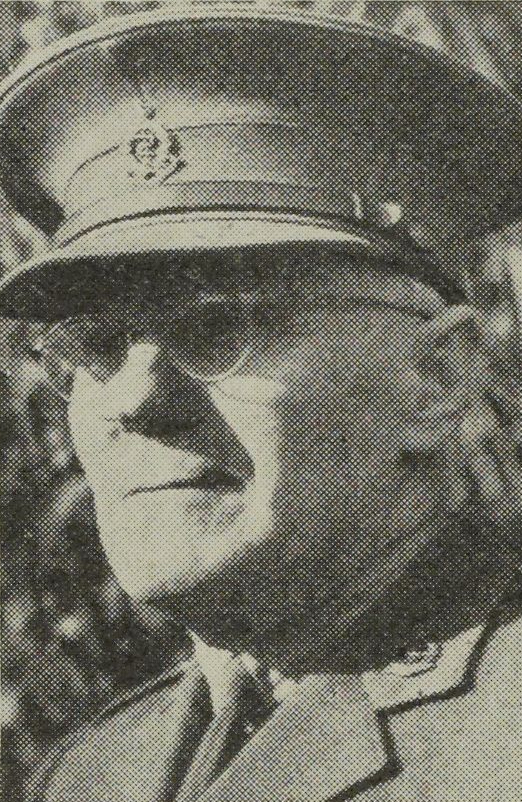
Frederick William Kemp

=== Member (MBE) ===
Military division, additional

- Flight Lieutenant John Darral Ackerman – Royal New Zealand Air Force; of Masterton.
- Senior Commander Jean Neill Erwin – New Zealand Women's Army Auxiliary Corps; of Christchurch.
- Major John Robert Griffin – 2nd New Zealand Expeditionary Force (Fiji Section); of Wellington.
- Flight Lieutenant Henry Charles Hudson – Royal New Zealand Air Force; of Wellington.
- Temporary Lieutenant Frederick Johnston – Royal New Zealand Naval Volunteer Reserve; of Auckland.
- Section Officer Mary Katrine Loughnan – New Zealand Women's Auxiliary Air Force; of Scargill.
- Warrant Officer (Class I) George John Narbey – New Zealand Temporary Staff; of Pukekohe.
- Temporary Major Frank Leonard Rees – Canterbury Regiment; of Christchurch.
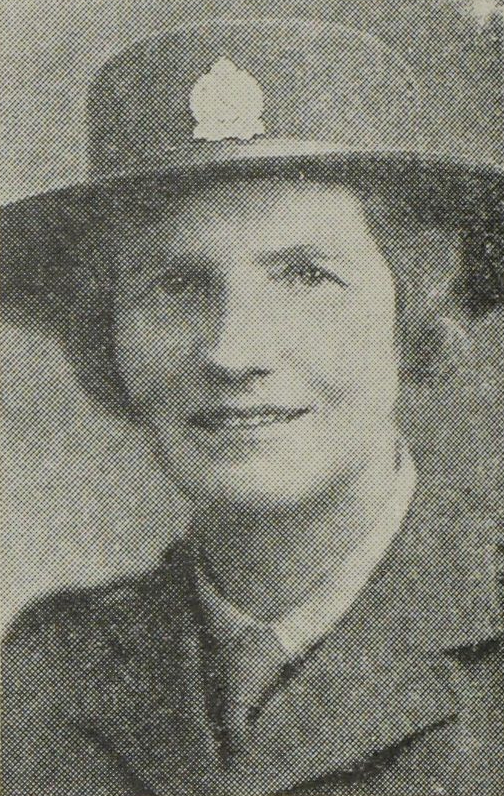
Jean Erwin

== British Empire Medal (BEM) ==
Military division

- Stores Chief Petty Officer James Charles Deane – Royal New Zealand Navy; of Auckland.
- Sergeant Hugh Gordon Dickson – New Zealand Medical Corps; of Auckland.
- Flight Sergeant George Andrew Edmond – Royal New Zealand Air Force; of Auckland.
- Staff Sergeant Edwin Richard Green – New Zealand Temporary Staff; of Hamilton.
- Flight Sergeant Eric George McEwen – Royal New Zealand Air Force; of Wellington.
- Corporal Robin Henry McNeilly – New Zealand Military Forces; of Lower Hutt.
- Flight Sergeant Arthur Jack Smaill – Royal New Zealand Air Force; of Timaru.
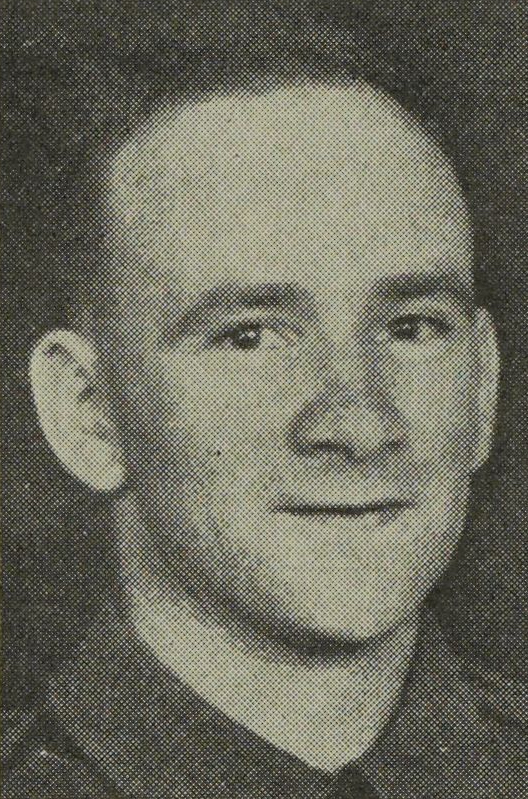
Hugh Gordon Dickson

== Royal Red Cross ==
=== Associate (ARRC) ===
- Charge Sister Beth Webster – New Zealand Army Nursing Service; of Hīhītahi.

== Air Force Cross (AFC) ==
- Flying Officer Alexander Agnew Appleby – Royal New Zealand Air Force; of Auckland.
- Flight Lieutenant David Laurence Bade – Royal New Zealand Air Force; of Wellington.
- Flight Lieutenant Alfred Sydney Drew DFC – Royal New Zealand Air Force; of Auckland.
- Squadron Leader Vincent David Gain – Royal New Zealand Air Force; of Dunedin.
- Flight Lieutenant William Higgins – Royal New Zealand Air Force; of Canada.
- Flying Officer George Willis Kidd – Royal New Zealand Air Force; of Thames Valley.
- Squadron Leader Kenneth Godfrey King – Royal New Zealand Air Force; of Lower Hutt.
- Flight Lieutenant·Lawrence Alan Lawton – Royal New Zealand Air Force; of Wellington.
- Acting Flight Lieutenant Sydney Harold Manning – Royal New Zealand Air Force; of Christchurch.
- Squadron Leader Allan Gerald Sievers – Royal New Zealand Air Force; of Wanganui.
- Acting Squadron Leader Douglas Hillyiard Stuart – Reserve of Air Force Officers.
- Flight Lieutenant Robert Francis Watson – Royal New Zealand Air Force; of Christchurch.
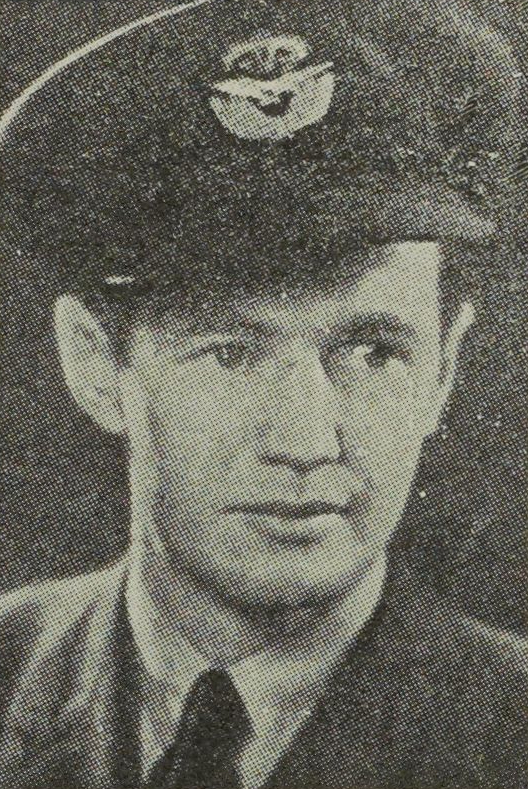
Alexander Appleby

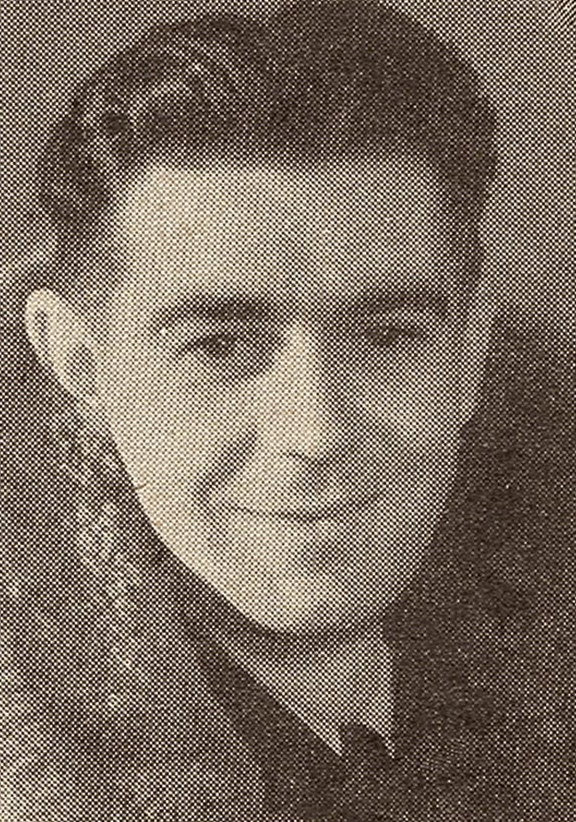
Albert Sydney Drew

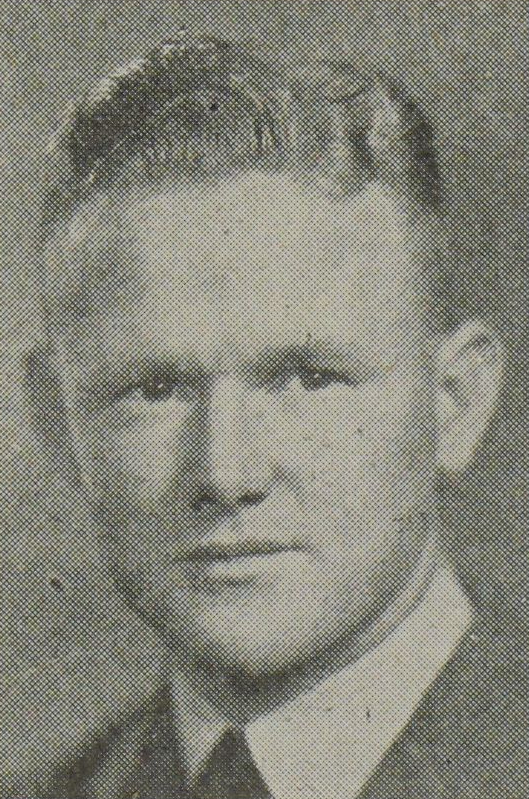
George Willis Kidd

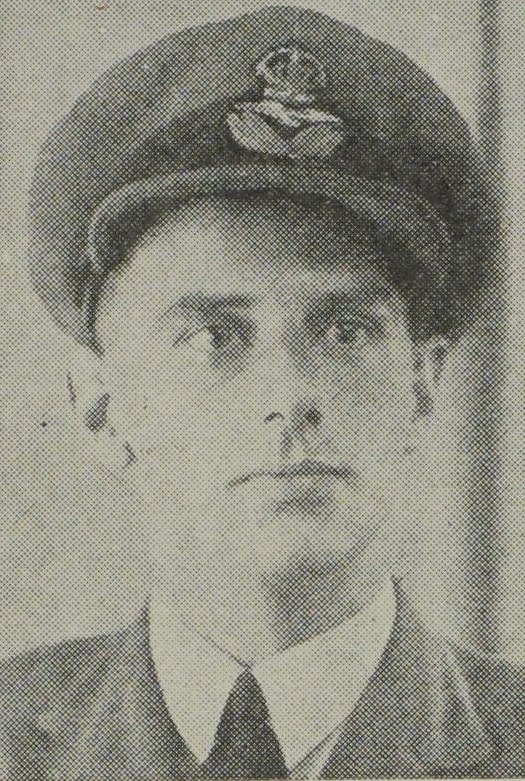
Sydney Harold Manning

== King's Commendation for Valuable Service in the Air ==
- Flight Lieutenant Kenneth Russell Clarke – Royal New Zealand Air Force; of Dunedin.
- Flight Lieutenant Charles Geoffrey Jamieson Cunningham – Royal New Zealand Air Force; of Tauranga.
- Flight Sergeant Arthur Henry Dallimore – Royal New Zealand Air Force; of Auckland.
- Flight Lieutenant Peter Durning – Royal New Zealand Air Force; of Timaru.
- Flying Officer Leslie Hunter Jolly – Royal New Zealand Air Force; of New Plymouth.
- Flight Lieutenant George Selwyn Martin – Royal New Zealand Air Force; of Christchurch.

== Mention in despatches ==
- Acting Flight Lieutenant Henry Drury Alcock – Royal New Zealand Air Force; of Napier.
- Acting Squadron Leader Wallace Campbell St Clair Bainbridge – Royal New Zealand Air Force; of Auckland.
- Flight Lieutenant Kenneth Henry Becroft – Royal New Zealand Air Force; of Helensville.
- Flight Lieutenant Douglas Gordon Elliot Brown – Royal New Zealand Air Force; of Auckland.
- Flying Officer Desmond Roy Browne DFM – Royal New Zealand Air Force; of Auckland.
- Sergeant Royden Joseph Burkitt – Royal New Zealand Air Force; of New Plymouth.
- Flying Officer Cyril George Clarke – Royal New Zealand Air Force; of Auckland.
- Flight Lieutenant Donald Louis Clow – Royal New Zealand Air Force; of Auckland.
- Flying Officer Daniel Clements Colmore-Williams – Royal New Zealand Air Force; of Auckland.
- Flying Officer George Currie Couper – Royal New Zealand Air Force; of Mosgiel.
- Flying Officer Alexander John Crawford – Royal New Zealand Air Force; of Mosgiel.
- Acting Squadron Leader Noel Ainsley Cresswell DFC – Royal New Zealand Air Force; of Napier.
- Flying Officer Herbert James Dalzell – Royal New Zealand Air Force; of Taratuhi, Oaro.
- Acting Squadron Leader Archibald England Davis DFC – Royal New Zealand Air Force; of Ōrākei.
- Flight Lieutenant George Russell Dickson – Royal New Zealand Air Force; of Dunedin.
- Acting Flight Lieutenant Trevor Gordon Dill DFM – Royal New Zealand Air Force; of Kaipara Flats.
- Acting Squadron Leader Ian Gilman Dunn – Royal New Zealand Air Force; of Dunedin.
- Flight Lieutenant Edwin Leonard Eason – Royal New Zealand Air Force; of Ōtaki.
- Flight Lieutenant Roy Robert George Fisher – Royal New Zealand Air Force; of Cambridge.
- Flight Lieutenant Leslie Gerald Fowler – Royal New Zealand Air Force; of Auckland.
- Acting Squadron Leader Garth Reginald Gunn – Royal New Zealand Air Force; of Plimmerton. (Note: Since died of wounds)
- Temporary Lieutenant Douglas Leonard Hazard – Royal New Zealand Naval Volunteer Reserve; of Hamilton.
- Flying Officer Cyril John Hector – Royal New Zealand Air Force; of Runanga.
- Acting Flight Lieutenant Desmond George Geddes Horgan – Royal New Zealand Air Force; of Oxford.
- Acting Squadron Leader Francis William Kilgour – Royal New Zealand Air Force; of Wellington.
- Flying Officer Wallace James Marr – Royal New Zealand Air Force; of Auckland.
- Flight Lieutenant Patrick Stewart McBride – Royal New Zealand Air Force; of Colville.
- Acting Flight Lieutenant Cyril William McCardle – Royal New Zealand Air Force; of Martinborough.
- Flight Lieutenant William McDowall – Royal New Zealand Air Force; of Taupiri.
- Temporary Lieutenant Roderick Thomas McIndoe – Royal New Zealand Naval Volunteer Reserve; of Wanganui.
- Acting Wing Commander Hayden Hugh James Miller DFC AFC – Royal New Zealand Air Force; of Morrinsville.
- Flight Sergeant Michael Redmond Murphy – Royal New Zealand Air Force; of Christchurch.
- Leading Aircraftman William John Murphy – Royal New Zealand Air Force; of Auckland.
- Flight Lieutenant Kenneth Percival Fyans Neill – Royal New Zealand Air Force; of Mount Somers.
- Acting Squadron Leader Charles Fray Ormerod – Royal New Zealand Air Force; of Gisborne.
- Flight Lieutenant Ross Charles Sayers – Royal New Zealand Air Force; of Cambridge.
- Flight Lieutenant William John Robert Scollay – Royal New Zealand Air Force; of Wellington.
- Acting Squadron Leader Denis John Thomas Sharp – Royal New Zealand Air Force; of Nelson.
- Acting Flight Lieutenant Kenneth Smith – Royal New Zealand Air Force; of Auckland.
- Flying Officer Maxwell Tovey – Royal New Zealand Air Force; of Plimmerton.
- Flight Lieutenant John Spencer Watson – Royal New Zealand Air Force; of Auckland.
- Temporary Lieutenant Kenneth Howden Webb – Royal New Zealand Naval Volunteer Reserve; of Wellington.
- Flying Officer James Stewart Wilkinson – Royal New Zealand Air Force; of Wellington.
- Flight Lieutenant Stamford Seaton Williams – Royal New Zealand Air Force; of Orini.
- Lieutenant Howard Thomas Arthur Winnall – Royal Navy; of Auckland.
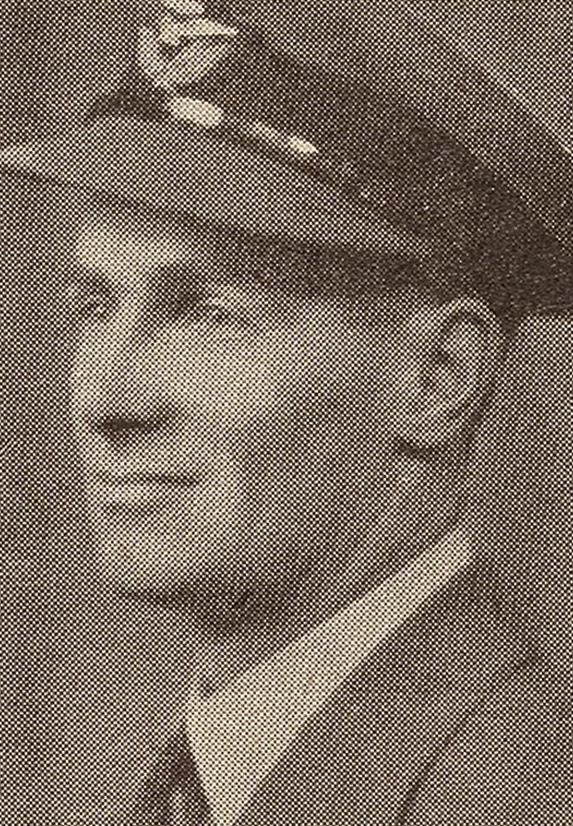
Kenneth Becroft

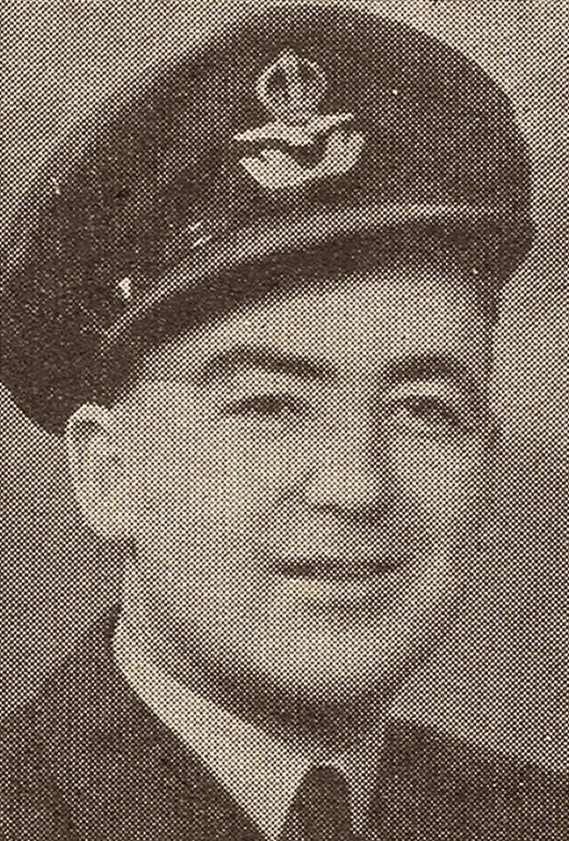
Noel Cresswell

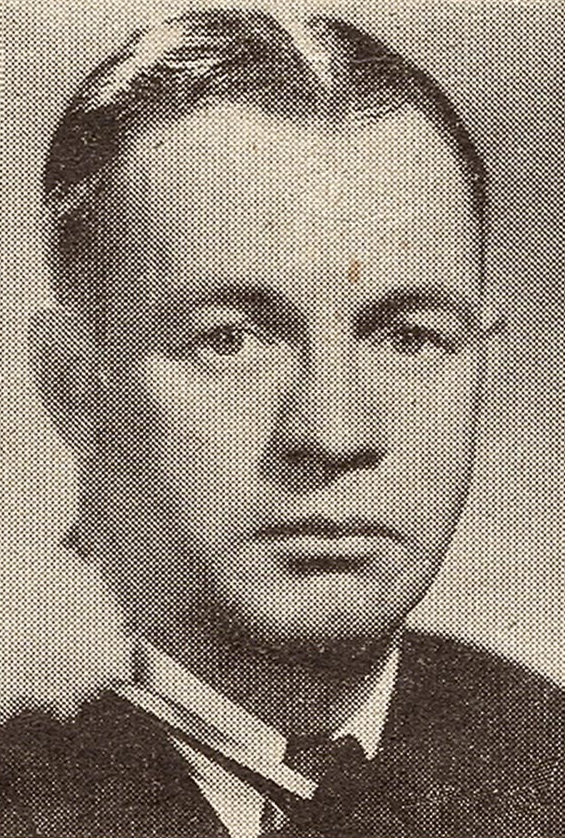
Archibald Davis

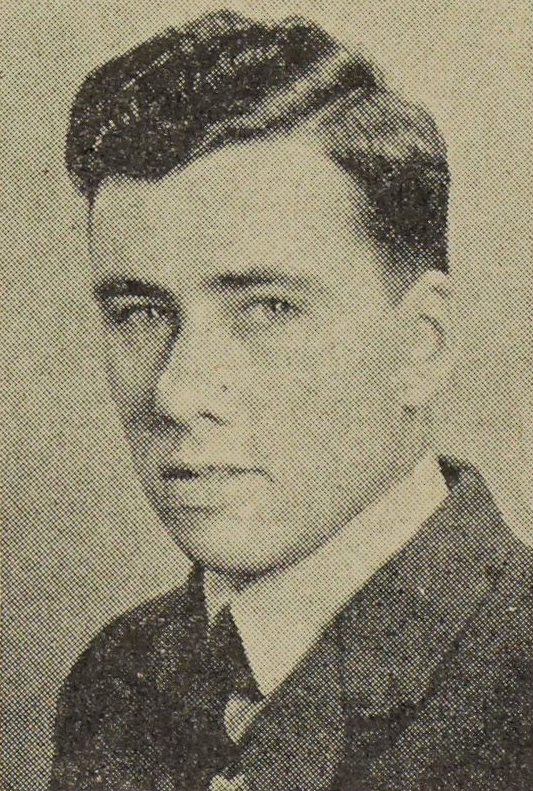
Trevor Dill

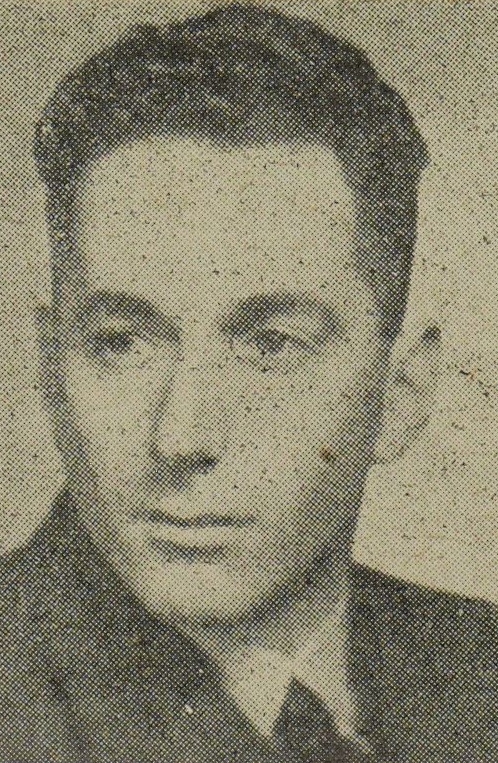
Leslie Gerald Fowler

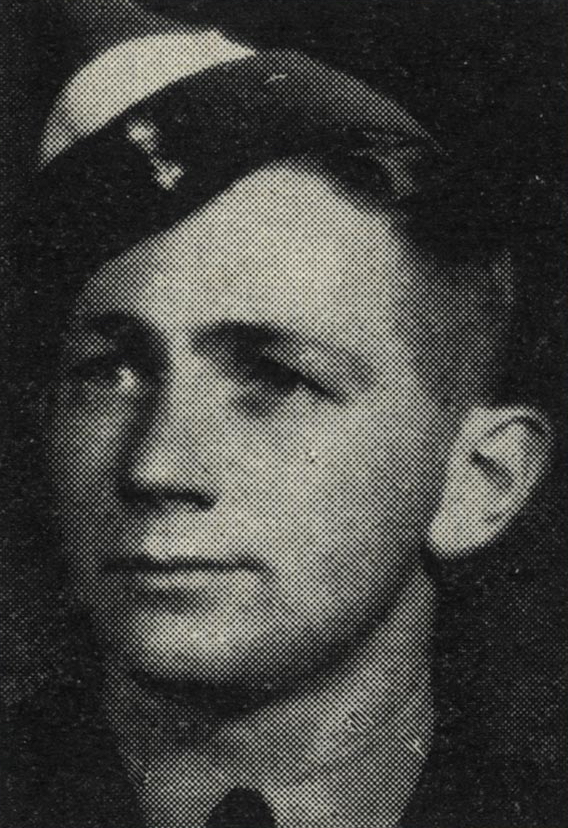
Garth Reginald Gunn

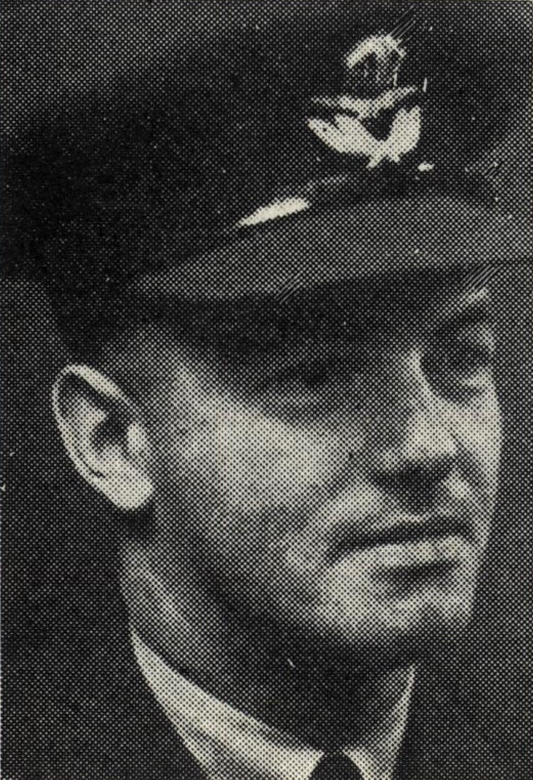
Hugh Miller

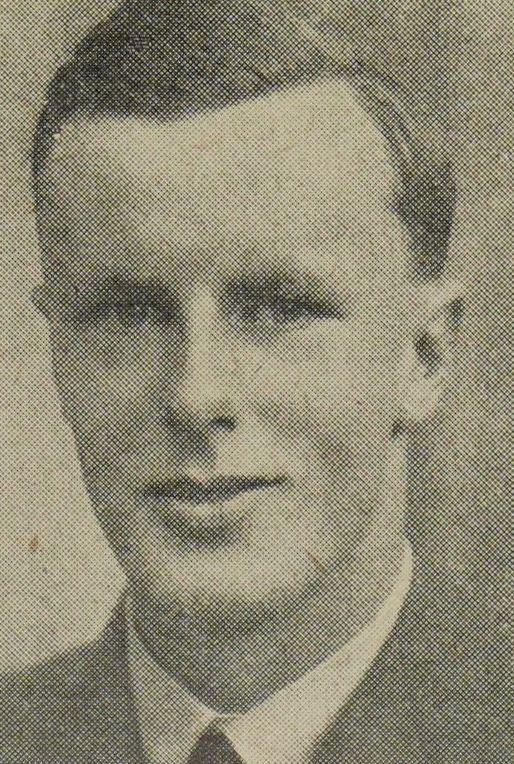
Ken Neill

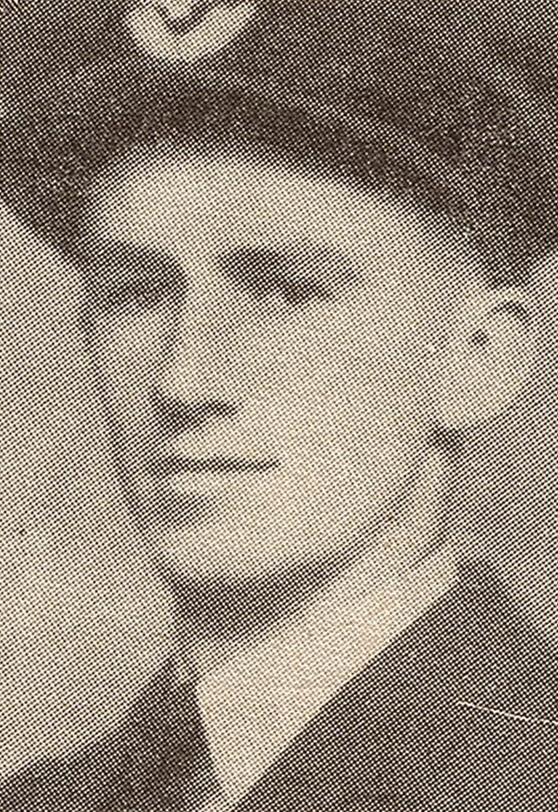
Charles Ormerod

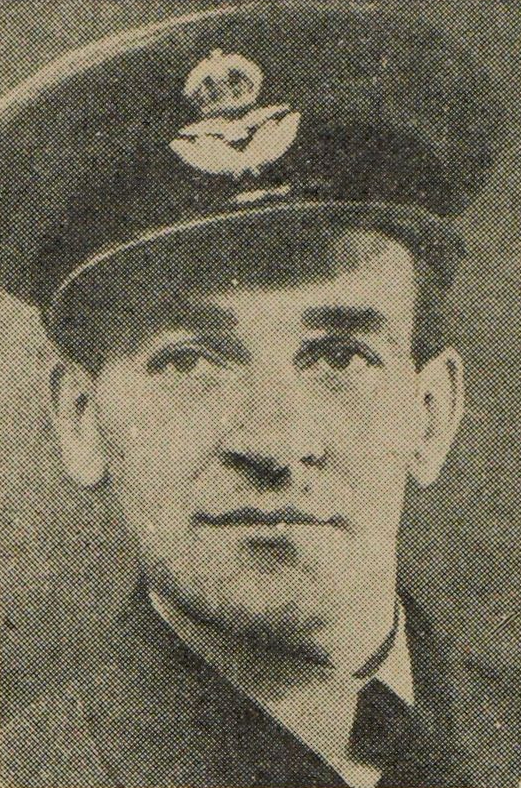
William Scollay

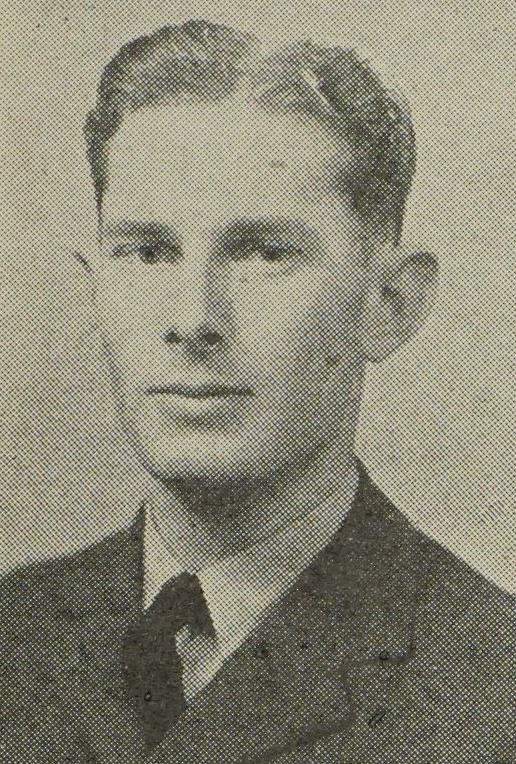
Stamford Seaton Williams
