= Louis Barnett =

New Zealand surgeon

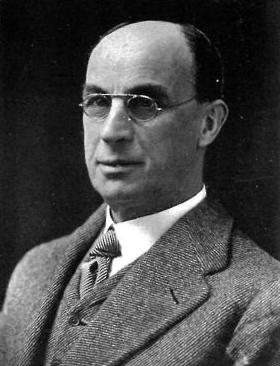
Louis Barnett

Sir Louis Edward Barnett CMG FRCS (1865–1946) was a New Zealand professor of surgery, the first New Zealander to be made a fellow of the Royal College of Surgeons and one of the founders of the Royal Australasian College of Surgeons.

== Early life and education ==
Barnett was born on 24 March 1865 in Wellington where he attended Thorndon School and Wellington College. He completed his medical training at the University of Otago from 1883 to 1884 and then the University of Edinburgh graduating MB ChB in 1888.

== Career ==
After working as a house surgeon at Middlesex Hospital he returned to New Zealand in 1891. In 1890 he was the first New Zealander to be made a fellow of the Royal College of Surgeons.

Following locum surgical positions at Dunedin Hospital and temporary lectureships at the University of Otago Medical School he became a full lecturer in 1899 and professor of surgery from 1909 until 1924.

In World War I he served as a surgeon with the Royal New Zealand Army Medical Corps in the New Zealand Expeditionary Force in Cairo.

Barnett researched the potentially fatal hydatid disease (see echinococcus) at the University and established the hydatid registry of the College of Surgeons. He spent time investigating the disease with Félix Dévé, a French authority on the hydatid parasite, in 1926.

Barnett established a reputation for safe and sound surgery, particularly aseptic principles. He was the first surgeon in New Zealand to wear rubber gloves and a gauze mask in the operating theatre. From 1920 he was instrumental in establishing a professional body for surgeons to raise the standard of surgery. In 1926 the College of Surgeons of Australasia (later the Royal Australasian College of Surgeons) was founded and Barnett served as president from 1937 to 1939.

He held positions as the editor of the New Zealand Medical Journal from 1893 to 1900 (which was amalgamated with the Australasian Medical Gazette from 1897 to 1900), as president of the New Zealand Branch of the British Medical Association from 1907 to 1908, and surgeon-in-chief to St Johns Ambulance from 1936 to 1946.

Barnett retired in 1924. In retirement he lived in Hampden where he is commemorated with a plaque outside his house.

== Personal life ==
Barnett married Mabel Violet Fulton, daughter of Catherine Fulton and James Fulton, on 31 December 1892. They had five children: sons Ralph, Miles Barnett, Sir Denis Barnett and Dr Geoffrey Barnett, and daughter Marjorie.

== Honours and awards ==
Barnett was awarded the CMG in 1918 for his war service. He was appointed a Knight Bachelor in the 1927 King's Birthday Honours. In 1935, he was awarded the King George V Silver Jubilee Medal.

== Death and legacy ==
On his retirement Barnett endowed the Ralph Barnett Chair in Surgery at the University of Otago in memory of his son who was killed in World War I. He also made donations to the University's medical library, a sports ground at Logan Park and a lamp of remembrance at Wellington College. Barnett died on 28 October 1946.
