= Basil Briggs =

English/Australian physicist (1923–1994)

- Born: 1923; Bradford, England
- Died: 8 February 1994 (aged 70–71); Adelaide, Australia
- Education: University of Cambridge
- Known for: Ionospheric physics
- Awards: Harrie Massey Medal and Prize, 1992
- Scientific career
- Fields: Physics
- Workplaces: University of Adelaide; Cavendish Laboratory
- Doctoral advisor: J. A. (Jack) Ratcliffe

Basil Hugh Briggs (1923 – 8 February 1994) was an English Australian physicist, Reader in physics at the University of Adelaide, winner of the Harrie Massey Medal and Prize for outstanding contribution to physics in Australia in 1992.

Briggs was born in Bradford, England, and was awarded a scholarship to the University of Cambridge (B.A. 1942, Ph.D. 1952). He was a Junior Scientific Officer, Telecommunications Research Establishment, in Malvern, Worcestershire, from 1942 to 1946. Then he worked at the Radio Research Group, Cavendish Laboratory, from 1946 to 1961. At Cavendish, Briggs joined with a small group to develop a mathematical procedure to deduce the horizontal motion of the ionosphere from radar signals detected on spaced antennas (see Journal of Atmospheric and Terrestrial Physics, 56, 831, 1994). Over many years, Briggs refined this correlation procedure, and was clearly acknowledged as a world leader in this area.

The Cavendish Radio Group began winding down in 1961 and Briggs searched for a university post. In 1962, Briggs became Senior Lecturer in Physics, University of Adelaide; a few years later became Reader until he retired. Briggs was a member of the editorial panel for the Journal of Atmospheric and Terrestrial Physics for 25 years. He is the father of the mathematician Keith Briggs.
