= Clarence Hotel =

Clarence Hotel may refer to:

- Clarence Hotel, Dublin, a hotel in Dublin, Ireland
- Clarence Hotel, Teddington, a pub, restaurant and hotel in London, England
- Clarence Hotel, Wigan, a pub in Greater Manchester, England
- Royal Clarence Hotel, a former hotel in Exeter, England
