= 1927 Birthday Honours (New Zealand) =

Awards list for New Zealand

The 1927 King's Birthday Honours in New Zealand, celebrating the official birthday of King George V, were appointments made by the King on the recommendation of the New Zealand government to various orders and honours to reward and highlight good works by New Zealanders. They were announced on 3 June 1927.

The recipients of honours are displayed here as they were styled before their new honour.

== Knight Bachelor ==
- Lieutenant-Colonel Louis Edward Barnett CMG MB ChM LRCP FRCS – of Dunedin; professor of surgery, University of Otago.
- The Honourable Āpirana Turupa Ngata – member of the House of Representatives and formerly member of the Executive Council.
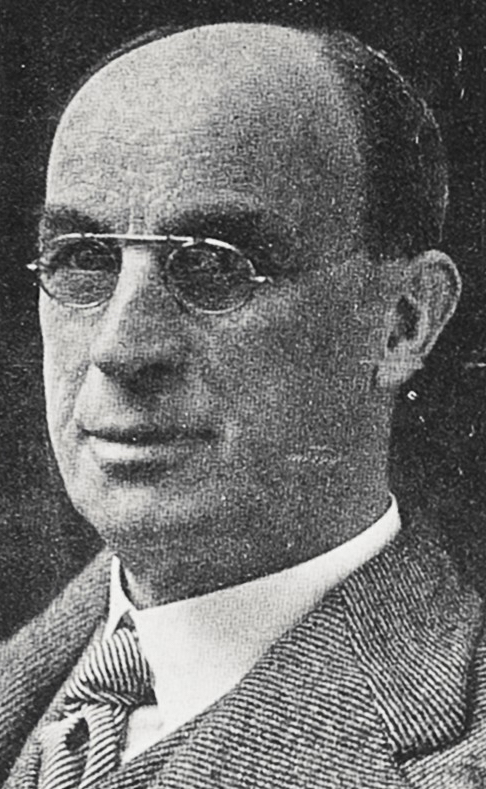
Sir Louis Barnett

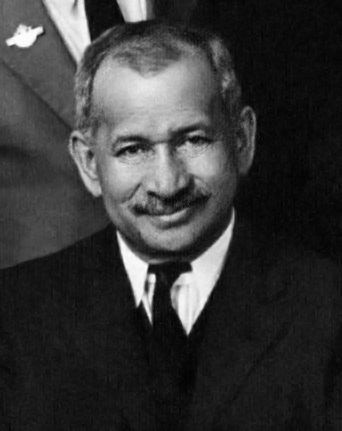
Sir Āpirana Ngata

== Order of the British Empire ==
=== Commander (CBE) ===
Civil division

- George Jerningham Little – private secretary to the governor-general.
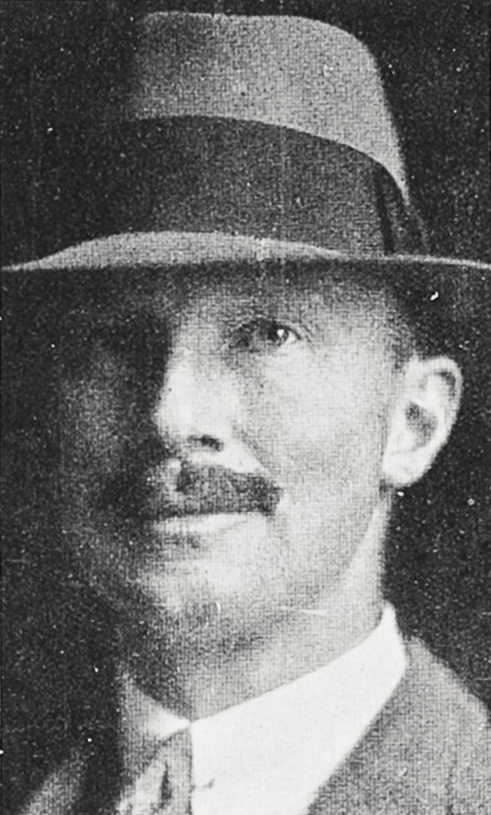
George Jerningham Little

== Companion of the Imperial Service Order (ISO) ==
- Frederick James Jones MVO – chairman of the Government Railway Board.
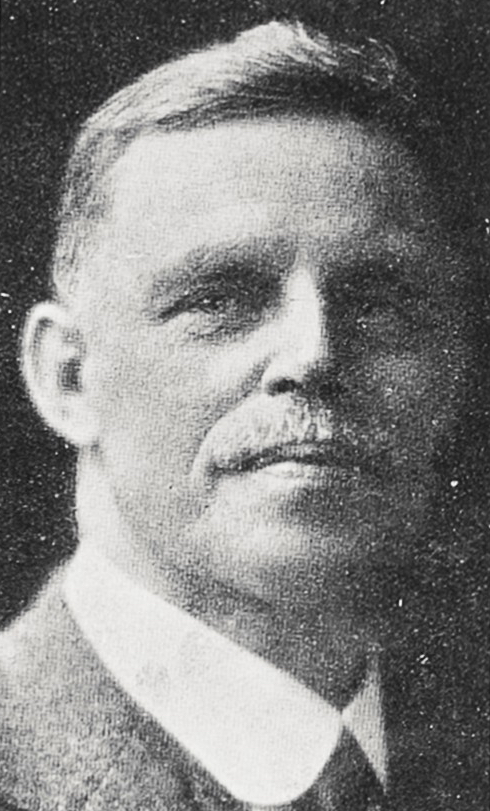
Frederick James Jones
