= Clarens =

Clarens is the name of several places:

- Clarens, South Africa, a town in Free State Province, South Africa
- Clarens, Hautes-Pyrénées, a commune in the Hautes-Pyrénées department of southwestern France
- Clarens, Switzerland, a small village in the canton of Vaud
- Clarens (Alexandria, Virginia), U.S., a historic mansion

== See also ==
- Clarence (disambiguation)
