= Radio Research Station (United Kingdom) =

UK government agency

The Radio Research Station (1924 – 31 August 1979) at Ditton Park, near Slough, Berkshire, England was a research centre into the applications of radio. It was the UK government research laboratory which pioneered the regular observation of the ionosphere by ionosondes. In continuous operation from 20 September 1932, it applied the ionosonde technology for the early developments which led to the British Chain Home radar system, which was operational during the Second World War.

Formally consistuted in 1927 and led by the radio engineer Robert Watson-Watt, early investigations performed at the site studied wave propagation and direction-finding. The station's work in ionospheric sounding, based upon the work of Edward Victor Appleton and Miles Barnett, proved to be useful in advancing other radio-based projects; numerous personnel from the station harnessed their experience when working at the Royal Radar Establishment in the late 1930s to develop radar.

In 1965, it was renamed the Radio and Space Research Station, to reflect its increasing role in space research. In 1974, it became the Appleton Laboratory, in honour of Edward Victor Appleton, who had received the 1947 Nobel Prize for his work on the ionosphere and who had long been associated with the station's research. In 1979, the laboratory merged with the Rutherford Laboratory to form the Rutherford Appleton Laboratory and over the next three years moved from Ditton Park to Chilton, Oxfordshire.

== History ==
The origins of the Radio Research Station can be traced back to the Radio Research Board, which was formed in 1920 by the Department of Scientific and Industrial Research (DSIR) to develop radio technology after events in the 1910s, chiefly the First World War, had demonstrated the growing importance of the field. Early activities, which included investigations on atmospherics, wave propagation, and direction-finding amongst other aspects of radio transmission, were typically centred around a field station outside Slough. This station was headed by the pioneering radio engineer Robert Watson-Watt. Shortly after Edward Victor Appleton and Miles Barnett demonstrated radio wave reflexion off of the ionosphere in 1924, they sought the cooperation of Slough in the undertaking of further work in this field; accordingly, it would host the majority of the fundamental experiments therein.

In 1927, the Radio Research Station was formally constituted. In 1931, the Slough site started to routinely perform ionospheric sounding. Accordingly, personnel based at Slough became throughly competent in using radio pulses to determine distance, which in turn became a fundamental understanding towards the development of radar during the 1930s. In 1933, Slough, along with several other radio research stations formerly under DSIR, were reorganised as the Radio Division of the National Physical Laboratory. Two years later, Watson-Watt reallocated several of Slough's more experienced members to work at the secretive and newly-formed Royal Radar Establishment.

In 1965, it was rebranded as the Radio and Space Research Station. By the end of the decade, it employed 275 personnel, 95 of which were engineers and scientists. Furthermore, it had an annual budget of £1,120,000, the five largest cost centres of which being data acquisition from satellites, rocket-based ionospheric experiments, the Chilbolton steerable aerial, wave propagation across the troposphere, and computing.

In 1973, the organisation became the Appleton Laboratory. In 1979, it merged with the Rutherford Laboratory; after which the majority of the work performed at the Appleton Laboratory was transferred to other sites, principally the Rutherford Laboratory's Oxfordshire site. However, ionospheric sounding continued to be performed at Slough into the 1980s.
