= Ditton, Slough =

Coordinates: 51.4908°N 0.5660°W

Ditton
- Location within Berkshire
- OS grid reference: SU996778
- Unitary authority: Slough
- Ceremonial county: Berkshire
- Region: South East
- Country: England
- Sovereign state: United Kingdom
- Post town: SLOUGH
- Postcode district: SL3
- Dialling code: 01753
- Police: Thames Valley
- Fire: Royal Berkshire
- Ambulance: South Central
- UK Parliament: Slough

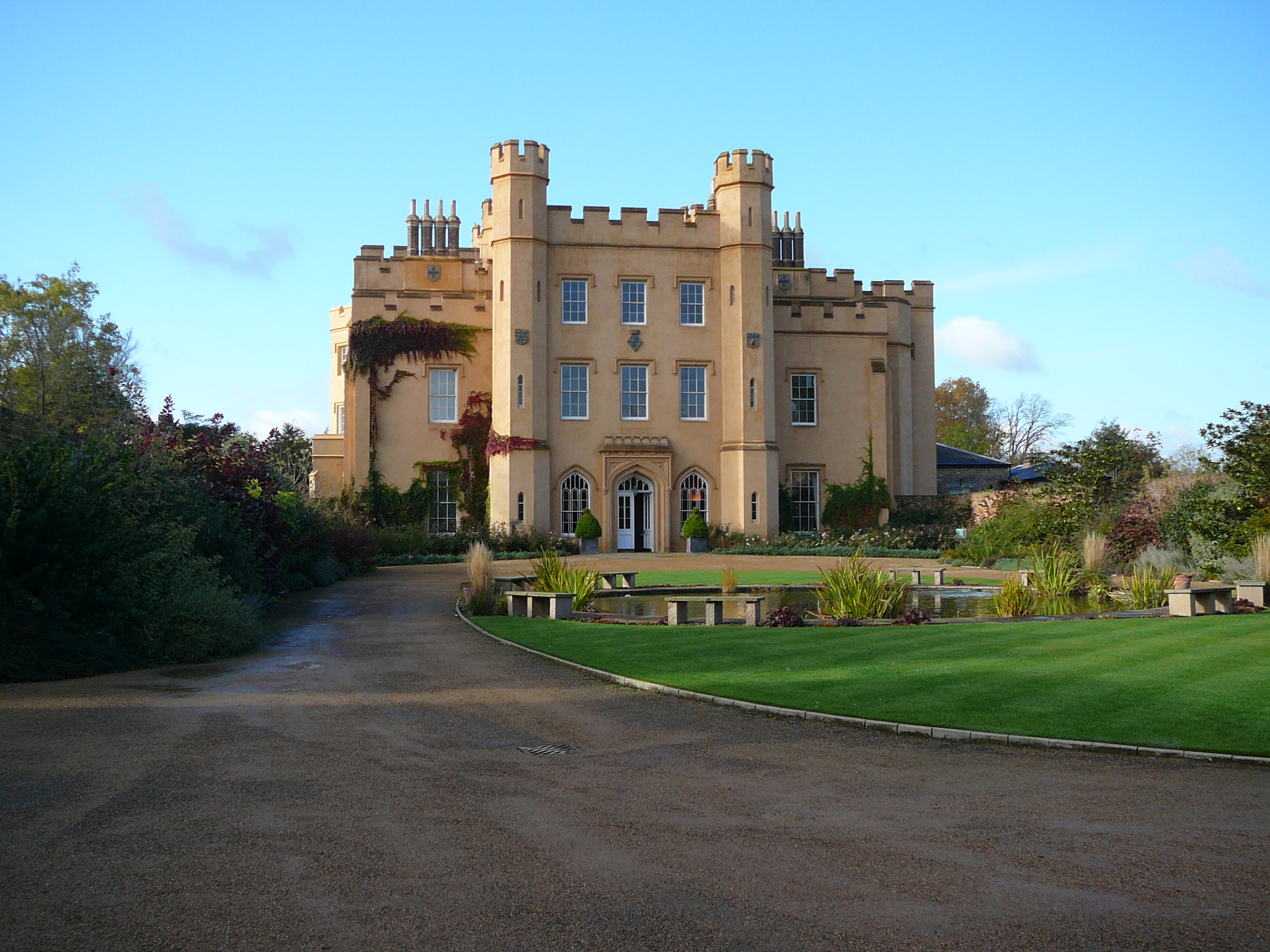
Ditton Manor, 2007

Ditton is a suburb of Slough, in the unitary authority area of Slough, in the ceremonial county of Berkshire, England.

It is also covered by the M4 and the Queen Mary Reservoir.

It was a hamlet in the parish of Stoke Poges. It was a separated part of the parish lying about 2 miles to the south west with the parishes of Upton and Langley Marish intervening.

It is most famous for being the location of the Manor of Ditton and Ditton Park. It was at Ditton Park in 1935 that the idea for the development of the British Radar Defence System was conceived.

It was transferred to Berkshire from Buckinghamshire in 1974.
