= Clarence House (disambiguation) =

Clarence House is a royal residence in the City of Westminster, London.

Clarence House may also refer to:

- Clarence House, Brighton
- Clarence House, English Harbour
- Clarence House, Richmond
- Clarence House Chase, a horse race in Great Britain
- "Clarence House" (Twenty Twelve), a 2012 television episode
