= Port Clarence (disambiguation) =

Port Clarence may refer to:

- Port Clarence, Alaska
  - LORAN-C transmitter Port Clarence
  - Port Clarence Coast Guard Station
- Port Clarence, England
- Port Clarence, Fernando Po (now Malabo, Equatorial Guinea)
