= Miles Barnett =

New Zealand meteorologist and physicist (1901–1979)

Miles Barnett OBE FRSNZ
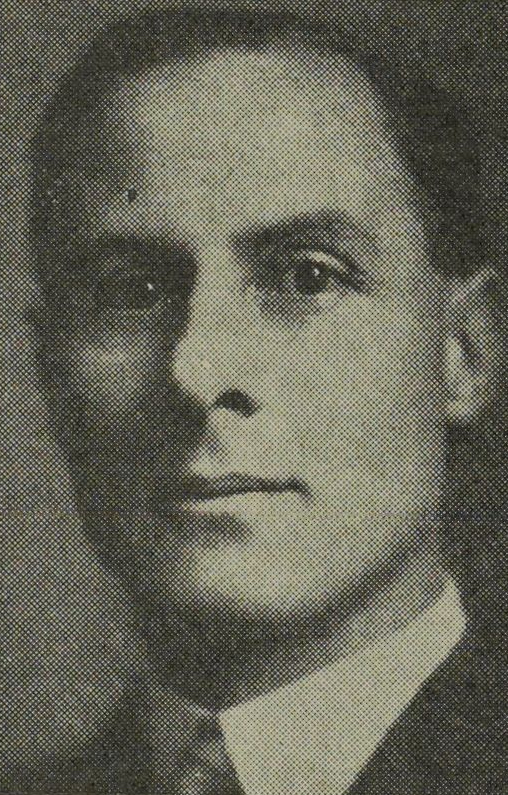
- Barnett in 1945
- Born: Miles Aylmer Fulton Barnett; 30 April 1901; Dunedin, Otago, Colony of New Zealand
- Died: 27 March 1979 (aged 77); Waikanae, New Zealand
- Education: University of Otago (MSc); University of Cambridge (PhD)
- Known for: Appleton–Barnett layer
- Spouse: Margaret Dalton (m. 1927)
- Children: 3
- Father: Louis Barnett
- Relatives: Denis Barnett (brother)
- Scientific career
- Fields: Meteorology; physics
- Workplaces: DSIR (1927–1935); MetService (1935–1962)
- Thesis: An experimental proof of large-angled deviation of wireless waves in the upper atmosphere (1927)
- Doctoral advisors: Edward Appleton; Ernest Rutherford

Miles Aylmer Fulton Barnett (30 April 1901 – 27 March 1979) was a New Zealand meteorologist and physicist. Born in New Zealand, he obtained his Ph.D. at the University of Cambridge in the United Kingdom. He worked there on the propagation of radio waves and on the ionosphere. Later, he returned to New Zealand, where he helped with the development of the Meteorological Service—becoming its director in 1939, just before the start of World War II. After the War, he participated in the transition between the International Meteorological Organization (IMO) and the new United Nations World Meteorological Organization (WMO).

== Biography ==
Miles Aylmer Fulton Barnett was born on 30 April 1901 in Dunedin, New Zealand, the son of surgeon Louis Barnett and Mabel Violet Fulton. His brother was RAF Air Chief Marshall Denis Barnett.

=== Education ===
Barnett attended school in Christchurch, before entering the University of Otago, where he gained many scholarships in mathematics. In 1924, he graduated with an M.Sc. in Mathematics and Physics, writing a thesis about the equipment used by Professor Robert Jack in his experimental radio broadcasts of 1921 and 1922.

Barnett started his Ph.D. at Clare College, Cambridge, in 1924. In the Cavendish Laboratory, Professor Ernest Rutherford assigned him the study of the propagation of radio waves, through what became known later as the ionosphere, under the supervision of Edward Appleton. He was awarded the diploma in 1927 and elected a Fellow of the Institute of Physics in 1929.

=== Career ===
In 1927, Barnett took part in a scientific expedition to Greenland, and married Margaret Alice Tenison Dalton in October of the same year. Returning to New Zealand, he worked at the Wellington head office of the newly established Department of Scientific and Industrial Research (DSIR) on a variety of problems connected with geophysics, seismology, and radio research. In 1935, while in the United Kingdom, Barnett was appointed to the New Zealand Meteorological Service (then a branch of the DSIR) to develop aviation services. After his return, he trained staff, developed facilities, and prepared for trans-oceanic air services. In June 1939, following the death of Edward Kidson, he became Director of the Meteorological Service.

During the Second World War, the Meteorological Service was transferred to the Air Department and then to the Royal New Zealand Air Force (RNZAF). Barnett became a wing commander in charge of nearly 500 staff from the equator to the sub-antarctic islands. After the war, Barnett was involved in the creation of the World Meteorological Organization as New Zealand's permanent representative from 1951 until 1962. He was chairman of the national committee for the International Geophysical Year, and a member of the Carter Observatory Board and the Dominion Museum management committee. He became an RNZAF Reserve officer in February 1947, with the rank of group captain, and transferred to the Territorial Air Force from 1952 to 1962.

Barnett retired from the Meteorological Service in July 1962. He died on 27 March 1979 in Waikanae at the age of 77, survived by his wife and three children.

== Honours ==
In the 1945 King's Birthday Honours, Barnett was appointed an Officer of the Order of the British Empire (Military Division). In 1948, he was made an Officer of the U.S. Legion of Merit. In 1953, he was awarded the Queen Elizabeth II Coronation Medal.

In 1947, Barnett was elected a Fellow of the Royal Society of New Zealand, and became its president in 1964.
