= Clarence (surname) =

Clarence is a surname. Notable people with the surname include:

- Juma Clarence (born 1989), Trinidadian footballer
- Lovell Burchett Clarence (1838–1917), British barrister and Puisne Justice of the Supreme Court of Ceylon
- O. B. Clarence (1870–1955), English film and stage actor
- William Henry Clarence (1856–1879), king or hereditary chief of the Miskito people

== See also ==
- FitzClarence, surname of an illegitimate branch of the House of Hanover, the descendants of Prince William, later King William IV of the United Kingdom, and his mistress Dorothea Jordan
