= Algernon Fuller =

British military office and electrical engineer

Major-General Algernon Fuller CBE
- Born: 30 March 1885
- Died: 6 August 1970 (aged 85)
- Military career
- Allegiance: United Kingdom
- Branch: British Army
- Service years: 1904–1941
- Rank: Major-General
- Service number: 3072
- Unit: Royal Engineers
- Conflicts: First World War; Second World War
- Awards: Commander of the Order of the British Empire

Major-General Algernon Clement Fuller, CBE (30 March 1885 – 6 August 1970) was a senior British Army officer during the Second World War, and inventor of the Fullerphone.

== Biography ==
Born on 30 March 1885, Algernon Fuller was educated at Bedford School and at the Royal Military Academy, Woolwich. He received his first commission in the Royal Engineers in 1904. He served during the First World War and, in 1916, he invented the Fullerphone, which enabled telephony and telegraphy to be used simultaneously on the same line, rendering the telegraphy secret. It was used widely during the First World War and thereafter, and Fuller was appointed as Experimental Officer at the Signals Experimental Establishment, Woolwich, between 1916 and 1920. He was Deputy Director of Mechanisation at the War Office, between 1938 and 1940, Director of Engineer and Signals Equipments at the Ministry of Supply, between 1940 and 1941, and Deputy Director-General of the Ministry of Supply, in 1941.

Major-General Algernon Fuller was appointed a Commander of the Order of the British Empire in 1941. He retired from the British Army in 1941 and died on 6 August 1970.
