= Costas Varotsos =

Greek physicist

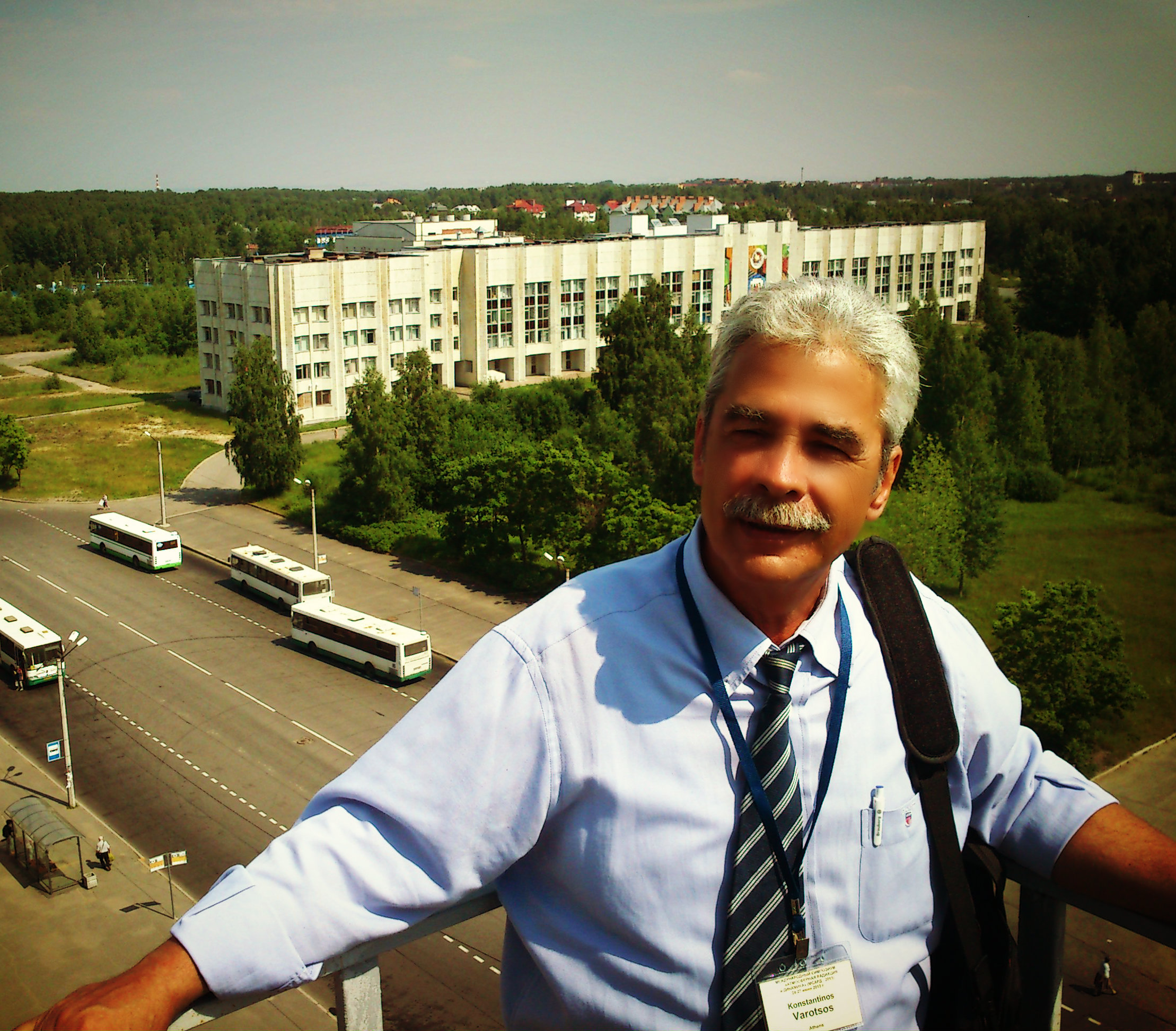

Costas Varotsos (Greek: Κώστας Βαρώτσος; born 14 August 1956) is a Greek physicist known from his contribution to the global climate-dynamics research and remote sensing.

== Work ==
Varotsos pointed out the occurrence of major sudden stratospheric warming over Antarctica in September 2002, an event which resulted in both the smaller-sized ozone hole over Antarctica and its splitting into two holes.

Prior to September 2002, it was thought, that a major sudden stratospheric warming could happen only in the Northern Hemisphere. His follow-up work on this subject published in Eos Transactions - the official Journal of the American Geophysical Union; and the Europhysics News.

Varotsos suggested the fractal structure of the total ozone and temperature in the Earth's atmosphere. In 2005-2006 he showed that processes based on the nonlinear nature of the atmospheric dynamics could probably address the question “What caused the southern hemisphere to exhibit very strong planetary waves in 2002?” This evidence is based on his new finding that the fluctuations of the total ozone content and temperature exhibit long-range correlations.

Varotsos has contributed to the fields of remote sensing, atmospheric physics & chemistry, and environmental change with 18 international books (monographs) published by Springer Publishing during 2000–2025.
