= Frank Edward Smith =

British physicist (1876–1970)

Sir Frank Edward Smith GCB GBE FRS
- Sir Frank Edward Smith, 1920 © National Portrait Gallery, London
- Born: 14 October 1876; Aston Manor, Birmingham, England
- Died: 1 July 1970 (aged 93); Minehead, England
- Spouse: Nelly May King
- Children: Betty May
- Awards: See list
- Scientific career
- Workplaces: National Physical Laboratory; Admiralty; DSIR; Anglo Iranian Oil; BSA

Sir Frank Edward Smith (14 October 1876 – 1 July 1970) was a British physicist and acting director of the National Physical Laboratory between 1936 and 1937.

== Biography ==
Smith was born in Aston Manor, Birmingham on 14 October 1876, the fourth of seven children of Joseph Smith, an office clerk, and Fanny Jane (née Hetherington).

He was educated at Corbett Street Board School, Smethwick, and then, from age 11, at Smethwick Central School. He studied at the Birmingham Technical School, from where he won a National Scholarship to the Royal College of Science (RCS). He was top of his class in physics, and received the Associateship of the RCS in physics (first class) in 1899.

=== National Physical Laboratory and the Admiralty ===
After an additional year at the RCS, demonstrating and teaching, Smith joined the National Physical Laboratory (NPL) in 1900, the year it was founded. He was appointed principal assistant in 1909 and superintendent of the electricity department in 1917. His work ethic was much influenced by that of the director, Sir Richard Glazebrook. Over a period of ten years he worked on the creation of "accurate electrical standards and methods of measurement", including devices to accurately measure amperes, ohms, and volts, as well as improvements to the Weston cell. These developments led Smith to propose an international congress on electrical units and standards. It was held in London in 1908. In March 1910 he sailed to Washington to assist the National Bureau of Standards in the implementation of the new standards. The Bureau described his contribution: "This work, claiming an accuracy [...] of 1 in 100 000, marks the beginning of a new epoch in the history of the absolute measurement of electrical quantities".

From 1914, Smith contributed to the NPL's war work. He invented the first magnetic mine for use against submarines. For this work, the Admiralty awarded him £2000. Smith's work to date was recognized by his election to the Fellowship of the Royal Society in 1918. In 1919 Smith joined the Admiralty, and in 1920 was appointed director of their new scientific research and experimental department at Teddington.

=== Department of Scientific and Industrial Research ===
In 1929 Smith was named secretary to the Department of Scientific and Industrial Research (DSIR), where he worked until 1939. He is said to have shown “great skill both in organization and consolidation, and in dealing with government departments, politicians, and industrialists”. During this period he was also active in many other organisations, including secretary of the Royal Society's council (1929-1938); president of the Physical Society (1924-1926); founder fellow of the Institute of Physics in 1920 (and later its president); and a governor of the Imperial Institute (1930–1938).

In 1938 Smith accepted a post as scientific adviser to Anglo Iranian Oil (later British Petroleum). He also worked in association with the Birmingham Small Arms Company, at first as an unofficial adviser, but in 1944 as chairman of the research committee. In 1947 he became a director, and resigned in 1957 on his eighty-first birthday.

=== Family ===
Smith married Nelly May King in 1902. They had one daughter, Betty May born in 1909. She married John H Fry in 1936, and died on 20 December 1990. Lady Nelly May Smith died at Minehead Hospital on 30 August 1961. Sir Fank Edward Smith died on 1 July 1970 at Blenheim Lodge Nursing Home, Minehead.

The Royal Society's memoir on Smith notes “… a curious incident. Between the issue of Who's Who for 1936 and that for 1937 the record of his birthday was changed to three years later, i.e. to 14 October 1879. His birth certificate at the Record Office, Somerset House and all the earlier records are consistent in giving his birthday as 14 October 1876. This change may have been a type-setter’s up-turning of a ‘6’ to a ‘9’ which Smith probably did not at first notice [...]. Later on in his life he began to adopt the changed date.” Even more curiously, the dates of birth for Smith, his wife and his daughter are all shown in the 1939 England and Wales Register as 3 or 4 years later than the true dates.

== Honours and awards ==
- 1899 ARCS, 1st class
- 1918 OBE
- 1918 FRS
- 1922 CBE
- 1925 Hughes Medal of the Royal Society
- 1926 CB
- 1926 Hon DSc University of Oxford
- 1927 Duddell Medal of the Physical Society
- 1930 Hon LLD University of Birmingham
- 1931 Hon LLD University of Aberdeen
- 1931 KCB
- 1934 Faraday Medal by the Institution of Electrical Engineers
- 1934 Gustav Canet Medal of the Junior Institution of Engineers
- 1936 Hon DSc University of Sheffield
- 1936 Charles Parsons Memorial Medal of North East Coast Engineers and Shipbuilders
- 1937 Fellow, Imperial College London
- 1938 Honorary Fellow, Institution of Civil Engineers
- 1938 Honorary Fellow, Institute of Physics
- 1939 GBE
- 1942 GCB
- 1947 USA Medal of Freedom with Silver Palm

Coat of arms of Frank Edward Smith

Notes
Displayed on a stall plate in the Henry VII Chapel at Westminster Abbey.
Motto
Progress Through Knowledge
