= Park Hotel, Teddington =

Pub, restaurant and hotel in Teddington, London

Coordinates: 51.425311°N 0.334315°W

The Park Hotel, Twickenham
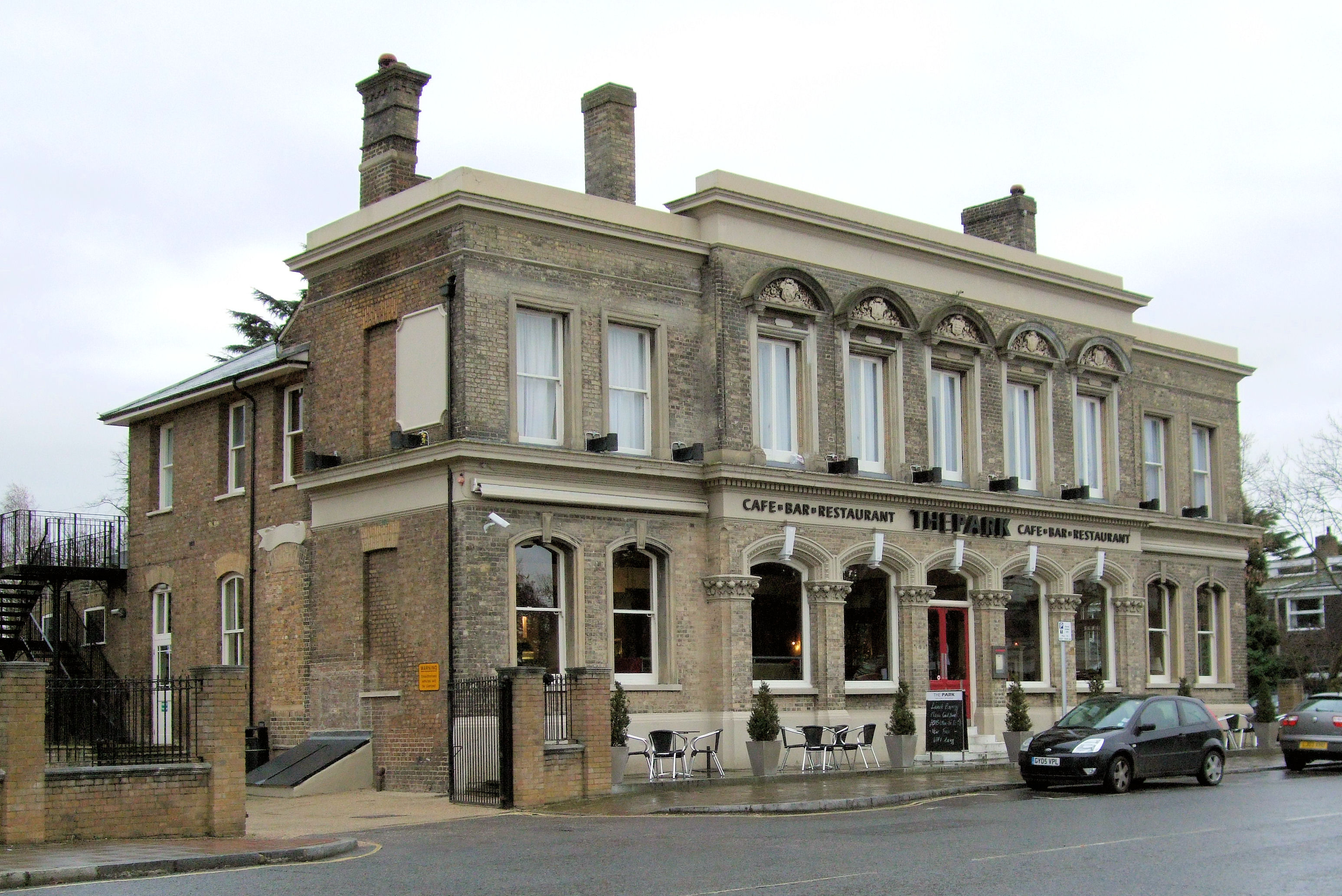

- Location within London Borough of Richmond upon Thames

General information
- Type: Public house
- Location: 19 Park Road, Teddington, London TW11 (in the London Borough of Richmond upon Thames)

Listed Building – Grade II
- Official name: Clarence Hotel
- Designated: 25 June 1983
- Reference no.: 1357755

The Park Hotel is a Grade II listed pub, restaurant and hotel at 19 Park Road, Teddington, London TW11.

An earlier building on the site was known as The Greyhound in 1729, and briefly, the Guilford Arms in 1795. It was rebuilt in 1863, and became the Clarence Arms Inn, and later the Clarence Hotel.
