= Ditton Park =

Country house in Datchet, Berkshire, England

Coordinates: 51°29′29″N 0°33′38″W

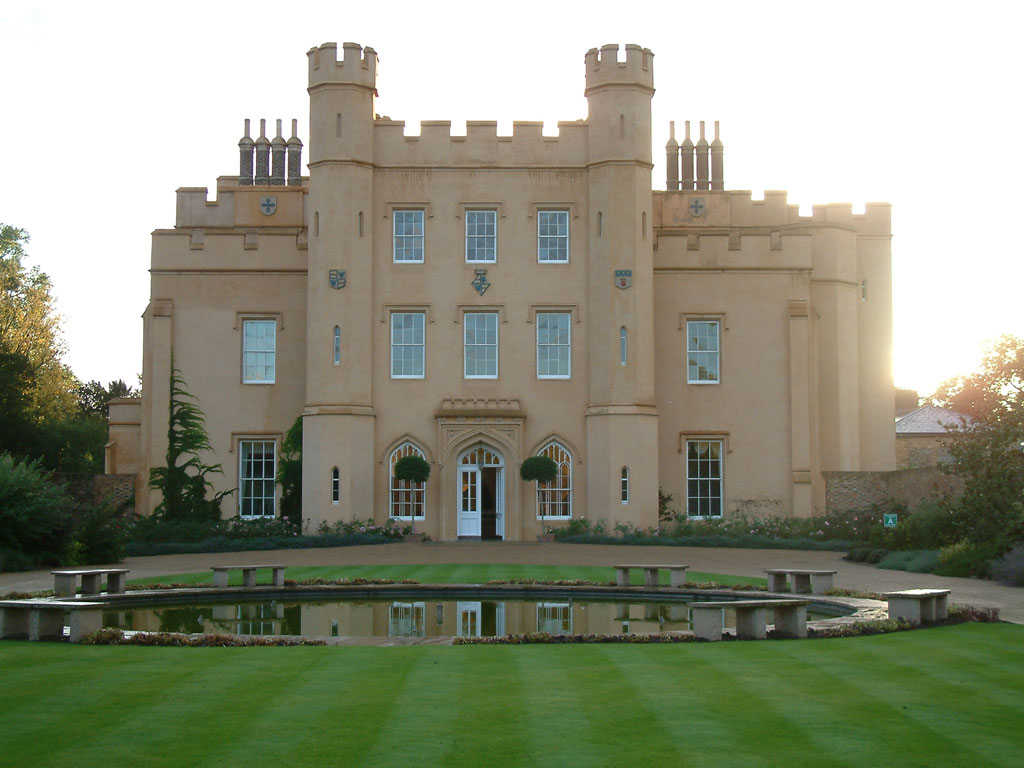
East front of Ditton Park House, 2004

Ditton Park, Ditton Manor House or Ditton Park House was the manor house and private feudal demesne of the lord of the Manor of Ditton, and refers today to the rebuilt building and smaller grounds towards the edge of the town of Slough in England. A key feature is its centuries-old moat which extends to most of the adjoining lawns and garden. Park areas extend to the north and west of the moat.

Ditton Park House and its courtyard walls, stables and observatory are Grade II listed on the National Heritage List for England.

== History and architecture ==
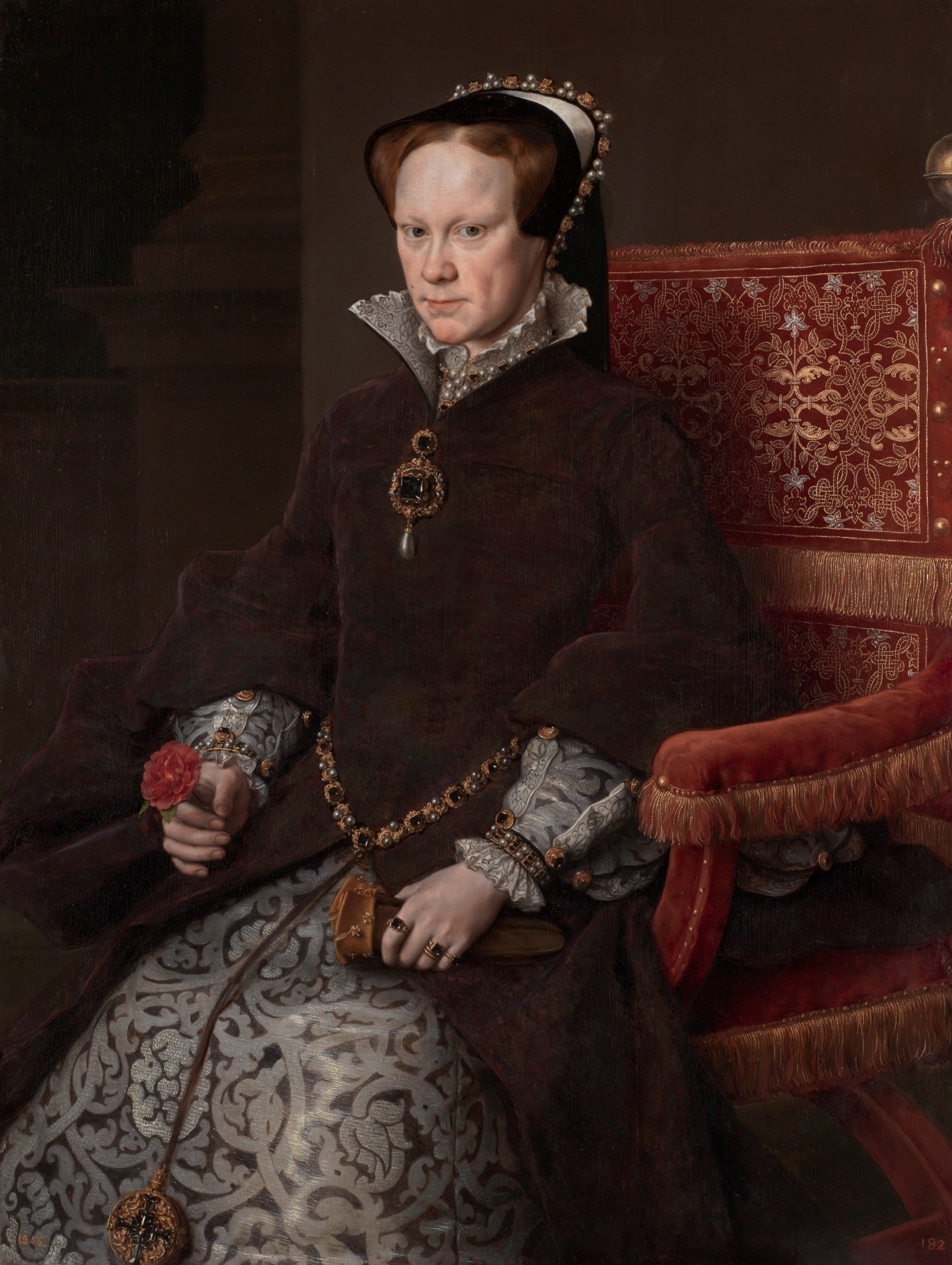
Queen Mary (I) of England, Portrait by Antonis Mor, 1554

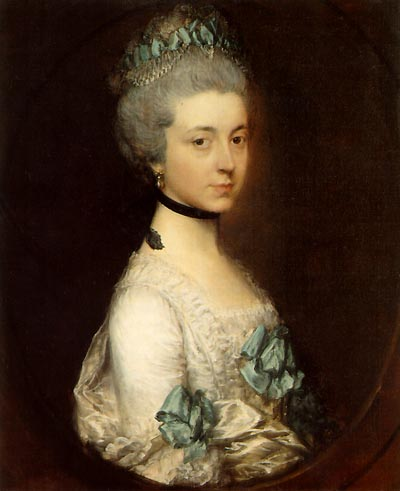
The Duchess of Buccleuch by Thomas Gainsborough, c. 1767, had this house, where she regularly lived, rapidly rebuilt in a new style following a fire in 1812.

Ditton Park belonged to the crown in the reign of Queen Elizabeth I and is in the ancient parish of Stoke Poges. It then belonged to Sir Ralph Winwood and passed to Ralph Montagu, 1st Duke of Montagu, through marriage. The direct precursor to the present house was probably built around the early 1600s and was taken down as damaged by fire in 1812.

The earlier house here was crenellated or fortified by John de Moleyns in 1331. In it or a later house, then a royal residence, the infant Princess Mary passed the autumn of 1517. It was enlarged at various times and is said to have been rebuilt by Sir Ralph Winwood in the early 17th century. Winwood improved the gardens and filled in the moat. The small building near the south-east corner of the park, formerly a chantry, became a chapel by 1925 served by the vicar of Datchet, since a few years later disused.

Its turrets and pale stucco crenelations bear a resemblance to earlier Strawberry Hill House, a prototype of the Gothic Revival architecture. Its warm, peach colour and tall symmetry reflects a movement towards Romantic architecture common in many of the high aristocracy's folly castles erected in the early 19th century. The house for much of the rest of the century when it was erected was the English home of Charlotte Anne, the Duchess then Dowager Duchess of Duke of Buccleugh /bəˈkluː/ (d.1895). This supplemented homes including the Scottish castles occupied frequently by her and by her son. Ditton Park House was by 1925 occupied by Lord Wolverton. The present square mansion, to which access is obtained by a drawbridge over the moat, stood in 1925 in a wider well-wooded park of 260 acres (1.1 km^{2}). The house and chapel were entirely rebuilt by Elizabeth, Duchess of Buccleugh (born Elizabeth Montagu also then spelt Montague) in 1812 and contains (or contained in 1925) many fittings from the former house, including the late 15th-century font, much 16th and 17th-century stained glass, and a glazed tile with a shield of arms, a fesse between six crosslets. In 1925 some 17th-century outbuildings stood.

Nearby, on the Great West Road, a public house, the Montague Arms stands which is owned and operated as a Harvester restaurant, dating back to the early 19th century.

In 1917 the remainder of the property, its farming tenants having long taken control through copyhold of their own lands, was taken over for the Admiralty Compass Observatory, which used the house and its immediate grounds. In 1920 an area, West Park, began to be used for radio research, which extended into North Park in 1924, and these activities eventually led to the formation of the Radio Research Station. It was here in 1935 that the idea for the development of the British radar defence system was conceived, code-named Chain Home. In the late 1990s, concern was raised regarding disturbing radioactivity from the World War II burial of radium-based, luminous paints.

The property was sold to Computer Associates in 1997 which became CA Technologies and is now running Wedding Events.

== Location ==
The manor was a detached part of Stoke Poges parish, which was in the southern extreme of the English county of Buckinghamshire, before boundary reorganisations: in 1934 it was transferred to the parish of Datchet, in 1974 Datchet became part of the borough of Windsor and Maidenhead in Berkshire, and in 1998 the borough gained unitary authority status in that ceremonial county.
