= Harold Alden Wheeler =

American electrical engineer

- Born: 10 May 1903; Saint Paul, Minnesota
- Died: 25 April 1996 (aged 92); Ventura, California
- Education: George Washington University, Johns Hopkins University
- Awards: IEEE Medal of Honor (1964)
- Scientific career
- Fields: electrical engineering
- Workplaces: National Bureau of Standards, Hazeltine Corporation, Wheeler Laboratories

Harold Alden Wheeler (10 May 1903 – 25 April 1996) was an American electrical engineer.

== Early life and education ==
Harold A. Wheeler was born in Saint Paul, Minnesota, to William Archibald Wheeler and Harriet Marie Alden Wheeler (a descendant of John and Priscilla Alden).

In 1925 Wheeler graduated from George Washington University with a Bachelor of Science degree in physics and was awarded the Ruggles Prize for excellence in Mathematics. Subsequently, he studied physics at Johns Hopkins University until 1928.

During his education he worked part-time at the National Bureau of Standards' Radio Laboratory, then from 1922 onwards at Stevens Institute of Technology, with Prof. Louis Alan Hazeltine, after discovering that they had independently invented the Neutrodyne receiver. (It entered large-scale production in 1923, and was the dominant receiver for most of the 1920s.)

== Career ==
In 1924 he became Hazeltine Corporation's first employee, and in 1925 created the first radio receiver with a diode automatic volume control that maintained a constant sound level while tuning to broadcasts of differing strengths. AM radio receivers incorporating this circuit came into use about 1930, and it has been included in every set since. He led the Hazeltine laboratory 1930–1939, and during this time received patents for 126 inventions on a wide range of work including circuits, test equipment, acoustics, antennas, transmission lines, methods of calculation for inductance of coils (included in all relevant textbooks since the mid-1930s), skin effect, coupled circuit theory, television scanning theory, and analysis and design of wide-band TV amplifiers.

During World War II Wheeler led work on identification friend or foe (IFF) antennas for aircraft, surface vessels, submarines, and ground stations. By war's end, these "lifesaver antennas" had been placed on all Allied ships.

In 1946 he founded Wheeler Laboratories to develop microwave circuits and antennas for missile systems tracking and guidance radar. In 1959, when it became a Hazeltine subsidiary, he was named a Hazeltine director and vice-president.

== Honours ==
All told, Wheeler held 180 United States patents and received over fifty awards. He was a member of the National Academy of Engineering, a fellow of the Institute of Radio Engineers (1927) and of the American Institute of Electrical Engineers (1946), and awarded the IEEE Morris N. Liebmann Memorial Award in 1940 "for his contribution to the analysis of wide-band high-frequency circuits particularly suitable for television", and the IEEE Medal of Honor in 1964 "for his analyses of the fundamental limitations on the resolution in television systems and on wideband amplifiers, and for his basic contributions to the theory and development of antennas, microwave elements, circuits, and receivers."

Wheeler was also a member of Sigma Xi, Tau Beta Pi, and the Defense Science Board.
