= John Vincent Lawless Hogan =

American radio pioneer (1890–1960)

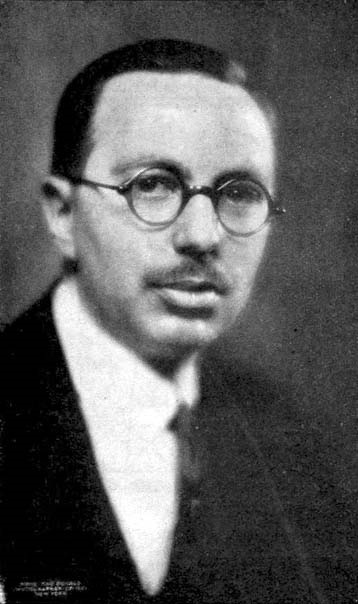
- Hogan in 1922
- Born: February 14, 1890; Philadelphia
- Died: December 29, 1960 (aged 70); Forest Hills, Queens
- Awards: IEEE Medal of Honor (1956)
- Scientific career
- Fields: Electrical engineering

John Vincent Lawless Hogan (February 14, 1890 – December 29, 1960), often John V. L. Hogan, was a noted American radio pioneer.

Hogan was born in Philadelphia, constructed his first amateur wireless station in 1902, began his career in 1906 as a laboratory assistant to Lee de Forest, and in 1907 participated in the first public demonstration of the audion tube (triode). From 1908 to 1910 he attended Sheffield Scientific School at Yale University, leaving without a degree to join Reginald Fessenden's National Electric Signaling Co. (NESCO) at Brant Rock, Massachusetts, where he served as a telegraph operator.

While working at NESCO and its successors, Hogan helped develop Fessenden's first crystal detector patent (1910), a patent on single-control tuning (1912), and in 1913 discovered the "rectifier heterodyne" which increased radio receiver sensitivity by a factor of 100. In 1913 led acceptance tests of the U.S. Navy's first high powered station at Arlington, and from 1914 to 1917 was chief research engineer, working primarily on high-speed recorders for long-distance wireless.

In 1921 Hogan became a consultant performing experiments in mechanical television, FM broadcasting, and facsimile transmission. By the late 1920s, he was broadcasting sound and pictures over his own experimental station, W2XR in New York City which officially went on the air March 26, 1929, having started his experimental transmissions of radio, facsimile, and television in 1928. During the 1930s his experiments with radio facsimile resulted in a machine capable of producing a 4-column newspaper, complete with illustrations, at the rate of 500 words per minute. He sold the station and its FM sister station (by then, WQXR and WQXQ) to The New York Times in 1944.

During World War II, Hogan served as special assistant to Vannevar Bush at the Office of Scientific Research and Development, working on radar, missiles, and the proximity fuze. After war's end, Hogan resumed work on facsimile transmission systems. He died on December 29, 1960, at his home in Forest Hills, Queens.

Throughout his life Hogan was active in professional societies, and in 1912 was instrumental in the formation of the Institute of Radio Engineers (IRE), serving as its president in 1920 and on its board of directors from 1912 to 1936 and 1948 to 1950. He was a Fellow of the IRE (1915) and of the American Institute of Electrical Engineers (1954), and received the IRE Medal of Honor in 1956 "for his contributions to the electronic field as a founder and builder of The Institute of Radio Engineers, for the long sequence of his inventions, and for his continuing activity in the development of devices and systems useful in the communications art." He was also a member of the Joint Technical Advisory Committee from 1948 to 1960.

== Selected works ==
- Hogan, J.L. Jr., "The Heterodyne Receiving System, and Notes on the Recent Arlington-Salem Tests", Proceedings of the IRE, vol. 1, no. 3 (July 1913), pages 75–91
- The Outline of Radio (Boston: Little, Brown and Co., 1923)
