= Patents and licensing in early radio =

Patents and licensing affecting early radio technology

The development of radio technology during the late nineteenth and early twentieth centuries was shaped not only by technical invention but also by patents and licensing agreements. Key technologies—including wireless transmission systems, vacuum tubes, and receiver circuits—were protected by patents held by individual inventors and large electrical manufacturers. As commercial broadcasting emerged in the 1920s, many of these patents were consolidated through licensing pools and cross-licensing agreements among companies such as the Radio Corporation of America (RCA), General Electric, Westinghouse, and AT&T. These arrangements strongly influenced which firms could manufacture radio equipment and played a major role in structuring the early radio industry.

A characteristic feature of early radio development was a continuing cycle in which patented inventions led to alternative technical approaches intended to avoid infringement, which in turn produced further innovation. The introduction of the triode vacuum tube enabled major receiver advances such as the regenerative circuit developed by Edwin Howard Armstrong. Patent restrictions on regenerative receivers encouraged alternative circuits including the Neutrodyne receiver and, later, the superheterodyne receiver. Similar patterns appeared in vacuum-tube design: the tetrode was introduced to reduce feedback instability in triode amplifiers, but its secondary-emission effects led to the development of the pentode and later the beam tetrode. These cycles of patent protection, technical work-arounds, and new inventions characterized much of the rapid progress in radio receiver technology during the 1910s and 1920s.

== Key patents in early radio ==
The following table lists patents frequently cited in the development of early radio technology, ordered by patent filing date.

Patent	Inventor	Filing date	Issue date	Title	Description
US 307,031	Thomas Edison	1883-11-17	1884-10-21	Electrical indicator	Describes thermionic conduction between a heated filament and a metal plate in a vacuum, later called the Edison effect, which later formed the basis of vacuum tube devices.
US 586,193	Guglielmo Marconi	1896-12-07	1897-07-13	Transmitting electrical signals	Early wireless telegraphy system using spark transmitters and coherer detectors.
US 652,230	Michael I. Pupin	1899-09-02	1900-06-19	Art of reducing attenuation of electrical waves	Introduced the loading coil, enabling long-distance transmission in telephone and radio circuits.
US 714,756	John Stone Stone	1900-02-08	1902-12-02	Method of selective signaling	Describes selective tuning of transmitting and receiving circuits in wireless telegraphy systems.
GB 1900/7777	Oliver Lodge	1900-04-10	1900	Improvements in syntonized telegraphy	Describes tuned transmitting and receiving circuits for wireless telegraphy.
US 763,772	Guglielmo Marconi	1900-11-10	1904-06-28	Apparatus for wireless telegraphy	Wireless communication system employing tuned circuits in transmitter and receiver.
US 803,684	John Ambrose Fleming	1904-04-16	1905-11-08	Instrument for converting alternating electric currents into continuous currents	The Fleming valve, a thermionic rectifier used as a radio detector.
US 879,532	Lee de Forest	1906-10-25	1908-02-18	Space telegraphy	The Audion triode vacuum tube introducing a control grid for signal amplification.
US 1,170,881	Lee de Forest	1912-10-16	1916-02-01	Radio signaling system	Vacuum-tube receiver circuits employing feedback amplification.
US 1,113,149	Edwin Howard Armstrong	1913-10-29	1914-10-06	Wireless receiving system	The regenerative receiver, using positive feedback to increase amplification and selectivity.
US 1,507,017	Lee de Forest	1914-03-20	1924-09-02	Wireless telegraph and telephone system	Wireless system using an audion as both oscillation generator and detector; part of the De Forest patent side of the regeneration litigation.
US 1,507,016	Lee de Forest	1915-09-23	1924-09-02	Radiosignaling system	Vacuum-tube signaling system involving feedback-related audion operation; also associated with the De Forest side of the regeneration disputes.
US 1,426,943	Ernst F. W. Alexanderson	1917-12-31	1922-08-22	High-frequency alternator	Patent relating to high-frequency alternator transmitters used for continuous-wave radio communication, part of the development of the Alexanderson alternator system.
US 1,342,885	Edwin Howard Armstrong	1919-02-08	1920-06-08	Method of receiving high-frequency oscillations	The superheterodyne receiver, converting incoming signals to a fixed intermediate frequency for improved selectivity and amplification.
US 1,450,080	Louis Alan Hazeltine	1920-08-07	1923-03-27	Neutralizing system for radio receivers	The Neutrodyne circuit neutralizing unwanted feedback between grid and plate in triode RF amplifiers.
US 1,424,065	Edwin Howard Armstrong	1921-06-27	1922-07-25	Signaling system	The superregenerative receiver, using periodic quenching of oscillation to obtain extremely high sensitivity.
US 1,641,621	Albert W. Hull	1925-01-28	1927-09-06	Electric discharge device	Screen-grid tetrode vacuum tube, introducing a grid between control grid and plate to reduce interelectrode capacitance and improve high-frequency amplification.
US 1,945,040	Gilles Holst and Bernard D. H. Tellegen	1926-06-11	1934-01-30	Means for amplifying electrical oscillations	U.S. patent for the pentode vacuum tube developed at Philips, adding a suppressor grid to reduce secondary-emission effects in screen-grid tubes.

== Regenerative circuit patent dispute ==
Contemporary trade publications documented both the legal disputes surrounding early radio patents and the corporate arrangements that followed. In 1916 the United States District Court for the Southern District of New York ruled that certain uses of the audion developed by Lee de Forest infringed the detector patent of J. A. Fleming, which was controlled by the Marconi Company. Reporting on the decision, The Wireless Age stated that the court found Fleming had first applied the thermionic vacuum rectifier based on the Edison effect as a detector of radio signals, and that the audion could operate on the same rectifying principle despite the different explanations given by de Forest for its operation.

A few years later, the same publication described the formation of the Radio Corporation of America (RCA), created through agreements among General Electric, the American Marconi Wireless Telegraph Company of America, and other patent holders to consolidate wireless patents in the United States. The reorganization was strongly encouraged by the United States government, which wished to ensure that strategic radio communications and key wireless patents would remain under American rather than British control following World War I. According to The Wireless Age, the new corporation was intended to combine the technical resources of General Electric with the wireless patents and stations of the American Marconi Company. These developments illustrate how the intense patent disputes of the early radio era were followed by large-scale licensing arrangements and corporate reorganizations intended to stabilize the rapidly growing wireless industry.

A far longer and more complex dispute arose over the regenerative circuit. In 1912 Edwin Howard Armstrong discovered that feeding a portion of an audion’s plate signal back to its grid greatly increased amplification and could also produce oscillation. Further experiments carried out during 1912–1913 demonstrated that the effect could be used to produce highly sensitive receivers and radio-frequency oscillators. Armstrong filed a patent application in October 1913, and his patent for the regenerative receiver was issued on 6 October 1914 as U.S. patent 1,113,149.

Several other inventors asserted related claims. According to economic historian Robert Maclaurin, four principal claimants ultimately became involved in interference proceedings: Armstrong, Lee de Forest, Irving Langmuir of General Electric, and Alexander Meissner of Telefunken. The competing claims were backed by large corporations with significant resources for patent litigation; Meissner’s rights belonged to Telefunken, Langmuir’s to General Electric, and the de Forest patent had been purchased by AT&T.

== Early regenerative licensing ==
The invention of the regenerative circuit by Edwin Howard Armstrong in 1912–1913 made it possible to build extremely sensitive radio receivers using relatively few vacuum tubes. By feeding a portion of the output signal of a vacuum tube back to its input circuit, the amplification of incoming signals could be greatly increased, and with stronger feedback the circuit could oscillate and act as a transmitter. The regenerative receiver was immediately recognized as commercially important because it allowed sensitive reception with inexpensive equipment and relatively small antennas, enabling reception of distant signals even in urban locations.

Armstrong lacked the financial resources of the large corporations involved in radio patent litigation. To finance legal expenses, his attorneys licensed the regenerative circuit patents to a group of small manufacturers producing receivers for amateurs and experimenters. By November 1920 seventeen companies had accepted such licenses, agreeing to pay royalties of about five percent of net sales. These licenses were non-exclusive and non-transferable and restricted to receivers sold for amateur and experimental purposes. The invention quickly became the subject of competing patent claims. In addition to Armstrong, other inventors asserting related feedback circuits included Lee de Forest, Irving Langmuir of General Electric, and Alexander Meissner of Telefunken.

The restricted nature of these licenses was confirmed in later litigation. In Westinghouse Electric & Manufacturing Co. v. Radio-Craft Co. (1925), the United States Court of Appeals for the Third Circuit examined the terms of an Armstrong regenerative license. The court held that the license permitted sales only to radio amateurs, experimenters, and scientific schools, and did not allow sales through normal commercial distribution channels such as wholesalers or retail dealers. The decision emphasized that the agreement reserved the broader commercial market for the patent owner and that any sales outside the specified classes constituted infringement.

The regenerative circuit patent became the subject of extensive litigation that lasted more than two decades. The dispute was ultimately resolved in 1934 when the Supreme Court of the United States upheld Lee de Forest’s claims relating to the feedback circuit. An editorial in the June 1934 journal Electronics commented on the long dispute:

The amount of money that has gone into this fight must run to several millions of dollars; so far as the art was concerned, wasted, gone to attorneys and patent lawyers instead of being reinvested in further research to the benefit of the art. So far as recognition goes, both de Forest and Armstrong are appreciated as inventors of the first rank—the only regret is that their energies could not have been spent exclusively in invention and not futilely dissipated in litigation.

— Electronics, June 1934, p. 192.

The regenerative-circuit dispute became one of the most famous patent conflicts in the history of electronics, illustrating both the importance of radio patents and the extensive litigation that accompanied the rapid growth of the industry.

The regenerative circuit patent became the subject of extensive litigation that lasted more than two decades. Earlier stages of the dispute reached the Supreme Court of the United States in the late 1920s, when the Court issued a decision recognizing priority claims associated with Lee de Forest's feedback circuit patents. The controversy continued through additional litigation and appeals before being widely regarded as settled by later rulings in the 1930s.

=== Licensed regenerative receiver manufacturers (c. 1920) ===
Company	Location	Notes
A. H. Grebe & Company	Richmond Hill, New York	Example licensee described assembling regenerative receivers from purchased components
C. D. Tuska Company	Hartford, Connecticut	Early amateur radio receiver manufacturer
Chicago Radio Laboratory (later Zenith Radio Corporation)	Chicago	Early regenerative receiver manufacturer
Precision Equipment Company	Cincinnati	Manufacturer of regenerative receivers later acquired by Crosley Radio
Adams-Morgan Company	Newark, New Jersey	Produced Paragon regenerative receivers

(Note: Maclaurin reports seventeen licensees but does not provide a complete list of the companies involved.)

=== RCA patent pool ===
The complexity of overlapping radio patents eventually led to large-scale cross-licensing agreements among major corporations. In 1919 the Radio Corporation of America (RCA) was formed to consolidate the wireless assets of the American Marconi Wireless Telegraph Company of America and to coordinate radio patent rights among major electrical manufacturers.

Subsequent agreements between General Electric, Westinghouse Electric Corporation, American Telephone and Telegraph Company, and RCA effectively created a patent pool covering many key radio technologies. Under these arrangements the participating firms cross-licensed their radio patents while dividing major areas of the business. General Electric and Westinghouse manufactured radio equipment, RCA handled sales and international communication services, and AT&T retained rights relating to radio telephony and long-distance transmission.

Important receiver technologies, however, remained outside the initial patent pool. In particular, the regenerative circuit invented by Edwin Howard Armstrong was controlled by Westinghouse, while Armstrong's later superheterodyne receiver patents were held by the National Electric Signaling Company (NESCO). As a result, several companies were unable to manufacture complete state-of-the-art receivers without risking patent infringement.

These patent restrictions directly influenced the design of early receivers. For example, early Westinghouse products were sold as separate components rather than a single receiver in order to avoid infringing the regenerative patent. The RA was a single-circuit tuner unit, the DA was a detector-amplifier with two stages of audio amplification, and the RC was a regenerative receiver consisting of the RA and DA combined. Westinghouse did not initially market the RC as a single integrated receiver until it obtained rights to the regeneration patent on 4 November 1920. The Armstrong feedback patent also affected RCA product planning. RCA initially proposed a receiver known as the “radio music box,” but concerns over the regeneration patent limited the ability of companies within the RCA group to place all receiver functions within a single cabinet until patent rights were clarified.

Patent conflicts continued to influence receiver development throughout the 1920s. Some receivers, such as the IP-501 regenerative receiver manufactured by Wireless Specialty and RCA, appear to have infringed the Armstrong regeneration patent, although the companies did not publicly acknowledge this issue.

By the mid-1920s newer receiver technologies began to displace earlier regenerative designs. RCA’s 1924 product line, for example, was eventually abandoned in favor of receivers based on Armstrong’s superheterodyne principle, including designs using harmonic frequency conversion.

These technical and legal constraints illustrate the central role played by patent control in shaping the early commercial radio industry. Receiver architecture, product packaging, and even corporate alliances were frequently determined as much by patent ownership and licensing arrangements as by engineering considerations.

RCA’s licensing policy became an important source of revenue and a major factor shaping competition within the radio industry. By the late 1920s the company had begun granting licenses more broadly to manufacturers wishing to produce receivers under the RCA patent portfolio. Royalties were initially set at 7½ percent of the net selling price of the receiver package, and by contemporary estimates RCA collected nearly $3 million in royalties in 1927 and more than $6 million in 1928. The licensing system nevertheless generated continuing controversy within the industry. Many manufacturers objected to paying substantial fees to a competitor and criticized RCA as a “patent octopus.” The royalty rate was reduced to 5 percent in 1932 and a licensing bureau was established to assist licensees technically. Despite these changes, disputes continued; one of the most notable involved Philco, which challenged RCA’s method of calculating royalty payments and ultimately prevailed in court in 1939.

=== Neutrodyne ===
The patent restrictions surrounding Armstrong’s regenerative circuit also encouraged the development of alternative receiver designs intended to avoid infringement. One of the most important was the Neutrodyne circuit developed by Louis Hazeltine in 1922. The Neutrodyne used neutralization of interelectrode capacitance in triode amplifiers to prevent unwanted feedback and oscillation, allowing stable multi-stage radio-frequency amplification without relying on regenerative feedback. Because the design did not employ the positive feedback covered by Armstrong’s patent, it could be manufactured without paying royalties for regenerative receivers. Hazeltine’s patents were administered through the Hazeltine Corporation, which licensed the Neutrodyne design to numerous manufacturers, making it one of the dominant commercial receiver architectures of the early 1920s before the later adoption of the superheterodyne receiver.

The need for neutralization circuits such as the Neutrodyne largely disappeared with the introduction of the tetrode vacuum tube incorporating a screen grid. The screen grid, placed between the control grid and the plate, greatly reduced the interelectrode capacitance that coupled the plate circuit back to the grid. By electrostatically shielding the input circuit from the output circuit, the screen grid suppressed the unintended feedback that had previously caused triode RF amplifiers to oscillate. As a result, stable multi-stage radio-frequency amplification could be achieved without neutralization networks, simplifying receiver design. A widely used example was the Type 224 screen-grid tetrode introduced in the late 1920s, which enabled practical high-gain radio-frequency amplifier stages in commercial broadcast receivers and contributed to the decline of neutrodyne receiver designs.

=== New vacuum tube (valve) structures ===
The introduction of the tetrode with a screen grid solved the feedback instability that had plagued triode radio-frequency amplifiers by electrostatically shielding the control grid from the plate and greatly reducing interelectrode capacitance. However, the tetrode introduced a new problem: secondary electrons emitted from the plate could be attracted to the positively charged screen grid, producing a characteristic “kink” in the plate-current curve in which plate current decreased with increasing plate voltage. This effect could cause instability and distortion in amplifier circuits. The problem led to the development of the pentode vacuum tube in the mid-1920s, which added a suppressor grid to repel secondary electrons back to the plate. Because pentode designs were covered by patents held by Philips, American manufacturers developed alternative approaches, most notably the beam tetrode, introduced by RCA in the 1930s, which used aligned grids and beam-forming electrodes to suppress secondary emission while avoiding the pentode patent claims.

=== Superheterodyne ===
Another major receiver architecture introduced during this period was the superheterodyne receiver, invented by Edwin Howard Armstrong during World War I. Because the superheterodyne offered substantially improved selectivity and sensitivity compared with earlier receiver designs, it quickly became one of the most valuable patents in the radio industry and an important element of the RCA patent portfolio. Westinghouse acquired Armstrong’s regeneration and superheterodyne patents in 1920, giving it control over important receiver technologies within the developing radio patent structure. As the broadcast receiver market expanded during the 1920s, licensing policies within the RCA patent pool played a significant role in shaping receiver design and production.

In 1927 the RCA group adopted a policy of licensing other manufacturers to produce receivers under its patent portfolio at a royalty of 7½ percent of the net selling price. These licenses initially covered only tuned radio-frequency (TRF) receivers—including widely used Neutrodyne designs—and excluded the more efficient superheterodyne receiver, which RCA had recently introduced and reserved for its own products. However, RCA was producing less than half of the radio sets sold in the United States, and many dealers favored TRF receivers supplied by competing manufacturers. As a result, RCA revised its policy in 1928 and began licensing superheterodyne receivers as well, after which tuned radio-frequency sets rapidly disappeared from the market.

== See also ==
Wenaas, Eric P. (2007). Radiola: the golden age of RCA, 1919-1929. Chandler, AZ: Sonoran. ISBN 978-1-886606-21-0.

Maclaurin, W. Rupert (1949). Invention and Innovation in the Radio Industry [world radio history] (PDF).
