= Lawrence C. F. Horle =

American electrical engineer

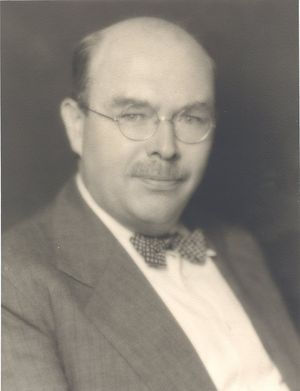
- Born: May 27, 1892; Newark, New Jersey
- Died: October 29, 1950 (aged 58)
- Awards: IEEE Medal of Honor (1948)
- Scientific career
- Fields: Electrical engineering

Lawrence Christopher Frank Horle (May 27, 1892 - October 29, 1950) was a noted American electrical engineer.

Horle was born in Newark, New Jersey, and in 1914 received his degree in mechanical engineering from the Stevens Institute of Technology, where he served as instructor until 1916. From 1916-1917 he was a design engineer of the Public Service Corporation, Newark, and 1917-1920 served as an Expert Radio Aide in the United States Navy, supervising the radio development laboratory at the Washington Navy Yard.

Horle was subsequently chief engineer of the de Forest Radio Telephone and Telegraph Company, New York; consultant, Department of Commerce Radio Laboratory, Bureau of Standards, Washington; chief engineer, Federal Telephone and Telegraph Company, New York; and vice-president, Federal Telephone Manufacturing Company, Buffalo. During World War II he served as civilian consultant to the Army Communications and Co-ordination Board of the Chief Signal Officer, United States Army.

Horle was active in standardization committees and the Institute of Radio Engineers, where he became a Fellow in 1925, served as president in 1940, and in 1948 he received the IRE Medal of Honor "for his contributions to the radio industry in standardization work, both in peace and war, particularly in the field of electron tubes, and for his guidance of a multiplicity of technical committees into effective action." He was also chief engineer of the Radio and Television Manufacturers' Association.
