= Ambrose Channel pilot cable =

Electromagnetic navigational aid

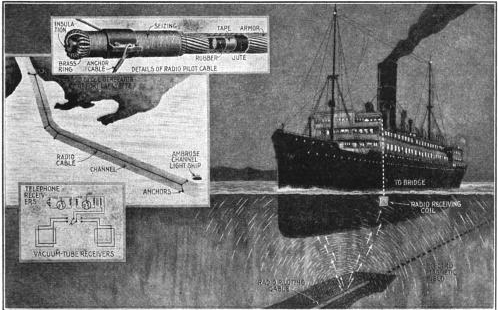
A period depiction of the Ambrose Channel pilot cable in action.

The Ambrose Channel pilot cable, also called the Ambrose Channel leader cable, was a cable laid in Ambrose Channel at the entrance to the Port of New York and New Jersey that provided an audio tone for guiding ships in and out of the port during periods of low visibility. The cable was laid during 1919 and 1920; it had been removed from the channel and replaced by wireless technology by the end of the 1920s.

== Background ==
Ambrose Channel is the main shipping channel into and out of the Port of New York and New Jersey, an important commercial port. Delays posed a major problem for shipping en route to New York City, and bad weather could close the channel for days. Ships were forced to wait at the harbor's entrance for conditions to clear. These delays cost shipping companies substantial amounts of money, with each ship costing between $500 and $4000 per hour it was stopped (roughly $5,700 to $46,000 in 2013 dollars).

== Description and operation ==
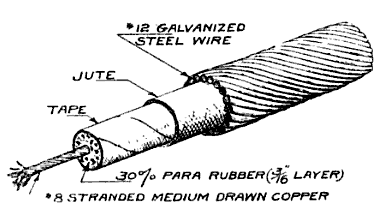
The Cable was composed of several layers.

The Ambrose leader cable was an armored cable with a single internal conductor (see picture) that acted like a long radio antenna laid on the channel floor. It originated at Fort Lafayette (near the present day Verrazzano–Narrows Bridge), then extended 16 miles down the Ambrose Channel to the vicinity of Lightship Ambrose offshore. It was powered by a 1 kilowatt generator at Fort Lafayette that produced 500 Hz (cycles per second) current at 400 volts, resulting in an alternating electromagnetic field along the length of the cable that could be detected to approximately a thousand yards away. The current was mechanically keyed to send the word "NAVY" in Morse Code.

A ship received by a pair of induction coils hung on opposite sides of the ship, and fed through an amplifier into a headset (see diagram, below). By switching between coils, the relative strength of the signal on each side could be compared. The ship maintained a course parallel to the cable by maneuvering to keep the signal strength constant.

== Research and development ==
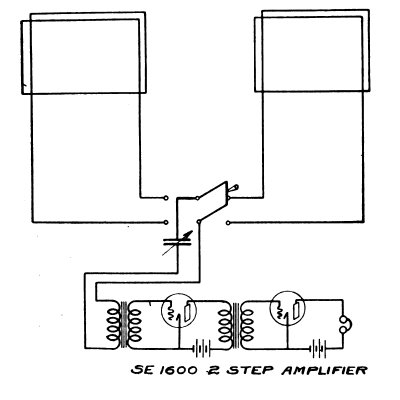
Two-stage vacuum-tube amplifier alternately takes input from inductance coils (top) hung on each side of ship.

The pilot cable required a series of prior discoveries and inventions. In 1882, A. R. Sennett patented the use of a submerged electrical cable to communicate with a ship at a fixed location. Around the same time Charles Stevenson patented a means of navigating ships over an electrically charge cable using a galvanometer. The method became practical when Earl Hanson adapted early vacuum tube circuits to amplify the signal.

Robert H. Marriott was a radio pioneer employed by the Navy in Puget Sound, where he conducted early experiments with underwater pilot cables. His results were sufficiently promising that he recommended further development to Commander Stanford C. Hooper. In October, 1919 Commander Hooper instructed A. Crossley, an expert radio aid, to develop and test the concept on a larger scale at the New London Naval Base. Crossley installed a longer version of the cable that Marriott had designed. He used a wooden-hulled launch for the first round of tests before moving to a steel-hulled submarine for later tests. Both types of vessel picked up the signal and followed the underwater test cable without problem.

== Installation and testing ==
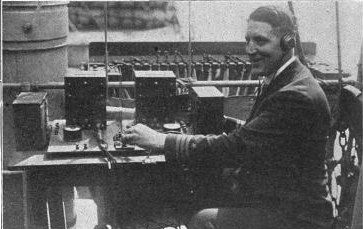
Commander R. F. McConnell on the USS Semmes with the "Hanson apparatus".

Following the successful tests at New London, the Navy proceeded to large scale testing in Ambrose Channel late in 1919. The minelayer Ord laid a pilot cable composed of 2,000 feet of leaded and armored cable, 2,000 feet of leaded cable, and 83,000 feet of standard rubber-insulated cable. The USS O'Brien was fitted with receiving equipment and attempted to follow the cable out of the channel. Unfortunately, it was unable to detect a signal past the 1,000 foot mark, where a break in the cable had prevented the signal from continuing. The break in the cable was repaired, but over the course of the winter of 1919–1920, crews found that the cable had broken in a total of fifty-two different places due to the strain placed on it while it was being laid. The damage was irreparable. Going back to the drawing board, engineers tested 150-foot segments of three different types of cable and used the results to design a new full-size pilot cable. The Navy ordered 87,000 feet of cable from the Simplex Wire and Cable Company in Boston.

Once complete, the cable was loaded onto the USS Pequot in the Boston Navy Yard. The ship arrived in New York on July 31, 1920. Ambrose Channel was already crossed by three telegraph cables, owned by Western Union, the Army, and the police, all of which had to be raised to the surface so the pilot cable could be laid underneath them. The installation of the cable was completed on August 6, 1920, and by August 28, electrical tests showed that both the sending and receiving circuits were functioning properly. The Navy tested the cable using the seagoing tug USS Algorma. It then invited "representatives of various radio companies, shipping interests, pilots' associations, governmental bureaus, naval attaches, and others" for a public demonstration on board the destroyer USS Semmes from October 6 through October 9. The ship's windows were covered with canvas and the captains took turns navigating using only the audio cues from the cable.

The cable was well received. Even before the New London tests, the Washington Post called it "the greatest development in marine travel since the invention of the steam turbine" and the Los Angeles Times declared the technology to be "one of the greatest peacetime gifts that science has devised." Once operational, the latter newspaper called it "the greatest safeguard devised for shipping in modern history". According to a 1921 trade magazine, leader cables had five functions: "to enable a ship to make a good landfall in thick weather, to lead a ship up the harbor, to lead a ship from open water through a restricted channel to open water on the far side, to give warning of outlying dangers, and to assist a vessel to keep a straight course from port to port and thus save fuel." In 1922, the publication Radio World stated that the cable's first two years of operation had been successful. Also in 1922, Radio Broadcast boasted about the money saved by the cable as well as the ease of using it. The cable itself was paid for using public funds, but it was the responsibility of ship owners to outfit their vessels with receiving equipment. Installation of the cable cost roughly $50,000 and the listening apparatus installed on each ship using the channel cost $1,200, compared with hourly costs of delays that ranged from $500 to $4,000. Radio Broadcast expressed the belief that navigation cables would become common for both ships and aircraft: "...there is a future for the audio cable... Its fullest usefulness at American ports and elsewhere waits, however, on that large appreciation of radio devices for sea as well as air navigation which pilots, both on the sea and in the air, expect, but do not as yet demand."

== Obsolescence and legacy ==
Despite the media hype, it appears that the Ambrose Channel pilot cable never met with large scale commercial success. Initially, some contemporaries of the cable proposed that it be extended several miles past the Ambrose light. Such plans never came to fruition, as advances in technology rendered the pilot cable obsolete. By 1929 the Baltimore Sun reported ships navigating the Channel blindly without making any reference to the cable. In that year, Marriott publicly complained that navigation cables still had unrealized potential for guiding ships.

Leader cable systems appear to have been made obsolete by the refinement of radio direction finding and the placement of radio beacons (low-power radio transmitters) at strategic locations. Those beacons are analogous to lighthouses, but can be "seen" in all weather, and are used for navigation in the same way as regular lighthouses. The first successful application of these radio beacons as "radio fog signals" were three stations installed near New York in 1921. In 1924, there were eleven stations in operation in the United States and nearly three hundred ships suitably equipped. By 1930, an article in the Journal of the Royal Society of Arts declared that "wireless aids and echo sounding have superseded [the leader cable]". Today, more modern navigation tools such as radar, GPS, and lighted buoys help ships navigate Ambrose Channel.

Earl Hanson, one of the key players in designing the Ambrose Channel cable, writing for Popular Mechanics, viewed it as a step toward applying radio cable technology in vast swaths of everyday life, including guiding aircraft and navigating and powering automobiles. The Ambrose Channel cable was removed from the channel and used in testing an early system of autolanding. The cable found no more success in that role than it did in guiding ships. The Blind Landing Experimental Unit later tried a similar system briefly before also abandoning it in favor of wireless.
