= Charles Concordia =

American electrical engineer

- Born: June 20, 1908; Schenectady, New York
- Died: December 25, 2003 (aged 95)
- Awards: IEEE Medal of Honor (1999)
- Scientific career
- Fields: Electrical engineering

Charles Concordia (20 June 1908 – 25 December 2003) was a noted American electrical engineer specializing in electrical power engineering and the early history of computer hardware.

== Biography ==
Concordia was born in Schenectady, New York. In 1926 he went directly from high school to General Electric as a test engineer. In 1934 he graduated from its Advanced Engineering Program and worked at General Electric until 1973. His early engineering work concerned television and detecting cracks in railway rails by magnetic field measurements.

During World War II he worked on generators and turbines for naval destroyer propulsion, researched aircraft superchargers, and helped develop ships' electrical drives. In the 1940s he chaired the American Institute of Electrical Engineers (AIEE) subcommittee on large-scale computing devices and continued consulting after the war. He married Frances Butler in 1948. In 1971 he earned a D.Sc. from Union College and later received an honorary D.Sc. from Iowa State University.

Concordia was a Fellow of the IEEE, ASME, and AAAS, a member of the National Academy of Engineering and NSPE, a founder and National Treasurer of the Association for Computing Machinery, and first chairman of the American Institute of Electrical Engineers' Computer Committee, forerunner of the IEEE Computer Society. For his work he received the Lamme Medal, the Centennial Medal, and the Power-Life Award from the IEEE and AIEE, as well as the Philip Sporn Award from CIGRE and both the Coffin Award and the Steinmetz Award from General Electric. He was awarded the 1999 IEEE Medal of Honor "For outstanding contributions in the area of Power Systems Dynamics which resulted in substantial improvements in planning, operation, and security of extended power systems".

== Selected works ==
- "Steady State Stability of Synchronous Machines as Affected by Voltage-Regulator Characteristics," Transactions of the American Institute of Electrical Engineers, 1944.
- Synchronous Machines: Theory and Performance, Wiley, 1951.
