= Robert H. Marriott =

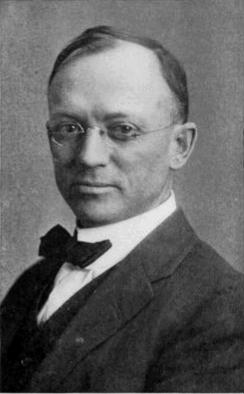
- Robert H. Marriott 1914
- Born: February 19, 1879; Richwood, Ohio
- Died: October 31, 1951 (aged 72); Brooklyn, New York
- Occupations: Electrical Engineer, Inventor
- Known for: Early radio development
- Spouse: Blanch Woodruff Butler (Married November 27, 1902)
- Children: Ethel Butler, Frances Anna, Woodruff Butler
- Parent(s): Franklin Waters and Minerva Ann (Woodruff) Marriott

Robert Henry Marriott (February 19, 1879 – October 31, 1951) was an American electrical engineer, and one of the first persons to work in the field of radio communication. In 1902 he engineered the first commercial radiotelegraph link established in the United States by a U.S. company, connecting the island of Santa Catalina with the California mainland. He founded the Wireless Institute professional society in 1909, which was merged in 1912 with the Society of Wireless Telegraph Engineers to form the Institute of Radio Engineers (IRE), and served as the IRE's first president.

== Early life ==
Marriott was born on February 18, 1879, in Richwood, Ohio, to Franklin Waters and Minerva Ann (Woodruff) Marriott. He attended the Ohio State University, where he enrolled in the college's General Science course, majoring in physics. Inspired by reports of Guglielmo Marconi's accomplishments in developing radio communication (then known as "wireless telegraphy"), in the spring of 1897 he began conducting his own experiments. He left college in February 1901 to become an Assistant Engineer for the American Wireless Telephone and Telegraph Company. In October 1901, he participated in that company's construction of temporary radiotelegraph stations that were used, with limited success, to report the results of the International Yacht races held in New York.

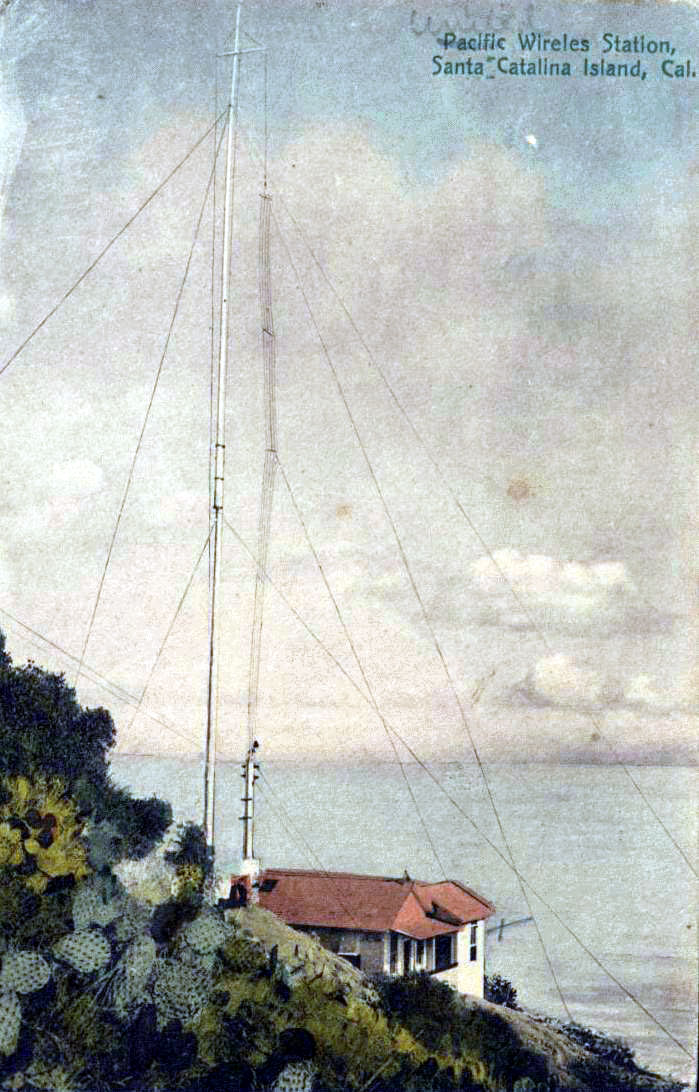
1910 postcard of the United Wireless wireless telegraph station located at Avalon, California, on the island of Santa Catalina

== Avalon radiotelegraph link ==
Acting as a parent company, American Wireless authorized regional subsidiaries, and in December, at the age of 22, Marriott became the Chief Engineer of the Pacific Wireless Telephone and Telegraph Company, headquartered in Denver, Colorado. American Wireless and its subsidiaries were primarily used for stock promotion, and had few legitimate business activities. Marriott was originally expected to build a radiotelegraph link between Denver and Golden, Colorado, which would have had little practical use beyond selling overpriced shares of stock. However, he instead developed a plan to construct a link that would have actual commercial value, from the California mainland to Catalina Island, which was isolated because it lacked a telegraph cable connection.

Radio communication at this time employed spark transmitters, which were limited to sending messages in Morse code. Marriott determined that a coherer receiver was too insensitive to bridge the 40 kilometer (25 mile) gap, so he developed a form of a light-contact microphonic receiver which allowed for audio reception of the dot-and-dash signals. The equipment for the two stations was constructed by the Carstarphen Electric Company in Denver, and transported to the sites for installation. The coastal terminus was located at White's Point near San Pedro, where it connected to Western Union's national telegraph system, while the island station was located on a seaside bluff north of Avalon.

Marriott encountered extensive skepticism among the residents of Santa Catalina about the feasibility of his project, to the point that a family acquaintance implied that, if needed, he was willing to help Marriott quietly leave the island to avoid the embarrassment of failure. However, in August 1902 regular service was begun, following a successful demonstration to representatives of the Los Angeles Herald. (Although this was the first commercial radiotelegraph link established in the United States by a U.S. company, the British-based Marconi Wireless Telegraph Company had previously established commercial stations on multiple islands in the Territory of Hawaii and at Nantucket Lightship, Massachusetts.)

In addition to regular commercial messages, the link was used to transmit content for a daily newspaper, known as The Wireless, which was published by the Los Angeles Times beginning on March 25, 1903. Ownership of the radio link would change numerous times, but it was regularly updated and remained in service until its replacement in 1923 by an undersea cable.

== Later work ==
In December 1902, Marriott, newly married, returned to Denver, where he worked for the Carstarphen Electric Company. In the middle of 1905 he became an engineer for the American De Forest Wireless Telegraph Company, and, when that company was reorganized in late 1906 as the United Wireless Telegraph Company, he stayed on as Supervisor of Construction and Maintenance. In 1908-1909 he experimented with an arc radiotelephone, transmitting from United's New York station, DF.

In 1909 he founded and served as president of the Wireless Institute professional society in New York City, which was merged in 1912 with the Society of Wireless Telegraph Engineers to form the Institute of Radio Engineers (IRE), of which he was the first president. (In 1963 the IRE and the American Institute of Electrical Engineers (AIEE) merged to create the Institute of Electrical and Electronics Engineers (IEEE).)

In 1912 United Wireless was taken over by the Marconi Wireless Telegraph Company of America, where Marriott continued as an engineer. From 1912 to 1915 he worked as a Radio Inspector for the U.S. Department of Commerce, initially posted in New York City, before transferring in late 1914 to Seattle, Washington. In 1915 he began ten years as a Radio Aide for the U.S. Navy. During that time he experimented in the Puget Sound with a system for guiding ships that used an induction current carried by an underwater cable. In 1922 this approach was used by the Navy with the installation of the Ambrose Channel pilot cable at the Port of New York and New Jersey.

In 1925 he became a consulting engineer, and worked with the Federal Radio Commission in 1928-1929. During the opening years of World War Two, he served as a chief examiner of the United States-British Civilian Technical Corps and a radar examiner for the U.S. Navy, prior to his retirement in 1943. After his death in 1951, the IRE Board of Directors noted his passing with a resolution that stated: "His foresight in discerning the need for a society of radio engineers was a powerful stimulus to the formation of the Institute. His unselfish, skilled, and unlimited devotion to the conduct of the activities of the Institute in its earliest years contributed substantially to the creation of the firm foundation upon which the Institute has grown."
