= USS Semmes (DD-189) =

Clemson-class destroyer

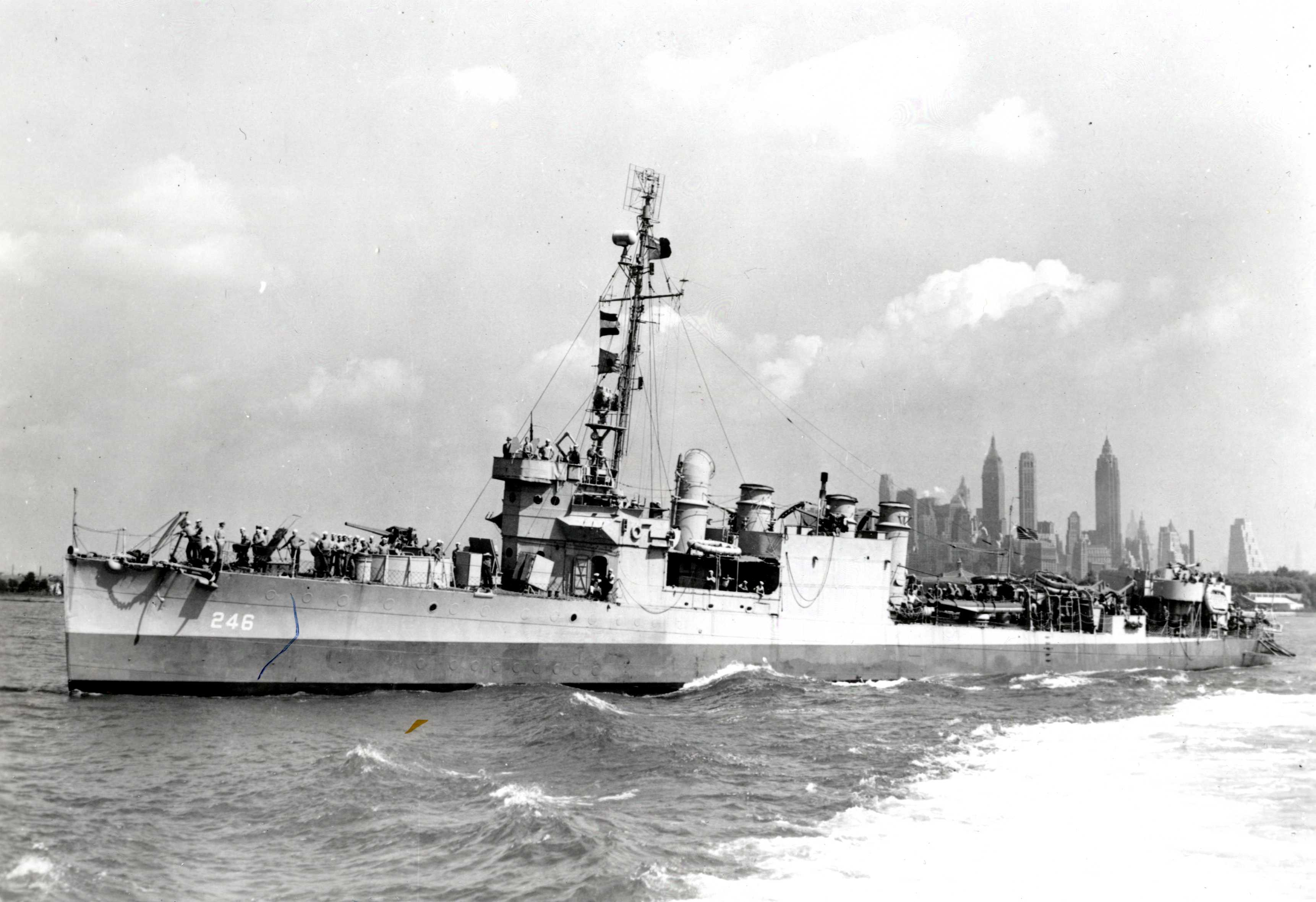
- Semmes in New York harbor

History

United States
- Name: Semmes
- Namesake: Raphael Semmes
- Builder: Newport News Shipbuilding & Dry Dock Company
- Laid down: 10 June 1918
- Launched: 21 December 1918
- Sponsored by: Mrs. John H. Watkins
- Commissioned: 21 February 1920
- Decommissioned: 17 July 1922
- Fate: Transferred to U.S. Coast Guard 25 April 1932
- Acquired: 20 April 1934 (from U.S. Coast Guard)
- Recommissioned: 20 April 1934
- Reclassified: Miscellaneous auxiliary, AG-24, 1 July 1935
- Decommissioned: 2 June 1946
- Stricken: 3 July 1946
- Fate: Sold for scrap 25 November 1946

United States Coast Guard
- Name: USCGD Semmes (CG-20)
- Acquired: 25 April 1932 (from U.S. Navy)
- Commissioned: 25 April 1932
- Decommissioned: 20 April 1934
- Fate: Returned to US Navy 20 April 1934

General characteristics
- Class & type: Clemson-class destroyer
- Displacement: 1,215 long tons (1,234 t)
- Length: 314 ft 5 in (95.83 m)
- Beam: 31 ft 9 in (9.68 m)
- Draft: 9 ft 4 in (2.84 m)
- Installed power: 26,500 shp (19,800 kW)
- Propulsion: 2 × geared steam turbines; 4 × boilers, 300 psi (2,100 kPa) saturated steam; 2 × shafts
- Speed: 35 kn (65 km/h; 40 mph)
- Range: 4,900 nmi (9,100 km; 5,600 mi) at 15 kn (28 km/h; 17 mph)
- Complement: 101 officers and enlisted
- Armament: 4 × 4 in (100 mm)/50 caliber guns; 1 × 3 in (76 mm)/23 caliber anti-aircraft gun; 12 × 21 in (530 mm) torpedo tubes (4x3); 1 × Y-gun depth charge projector; 2 × depth charge racks

USS Semmes (DD-189/AG-24) was a Clemson-class destroyer in the United States Navy during World War II. She was the first Navy ship named for Commander (USN), Rear Admiral (CSN), Brigadier General (CSA) Raphael Semmes (1809–1877).

== Service history ==
Semmes was laid down on 10 June 1918 by the Newport News Shipbuilding & Dry Dock Company, Newport News, Virginia; launched on 21 December 1918; sponsored by Mrs. John H. Watkins, granddaughter of Raphael Semmes; and commissioned on 21 February 1920. Semmes was used as a testbed for an experimental twin 4 inch gun mount, giving it an armament of five 4"/50 caliber guns rather than the normal armament for Clemson-class destroyers of four such guns. This armament was retained until at least 1931. A few months later, she was the first to navigate using only the Ambrose Channel pilot cable.

Following shakedown, Semmes participated in exercises along the northeast coast until January 1921 when she sailed south for winter fleet maneuvers in the Caribbean. From there, she transited the Panama Canal to cruise off the west coast of South America and returned to the Caribbean in late February to conduct further exercises out of Guantanamo Bay. In late April, she resumed operations out of Norfolk, Virginia.

The destroyer was ordered inactivated in 1922; and, on 12 April, entered the Philadelphia Navy Yard where she was decommissioned on 17 July 1922.

Reactivated 10 years later, she was transferred to the United States Coast Guard to serve in the Rum Patrol. She was commissioned in that service on 25 April 1932. As a Coast Guard destroyer, she was reconditioned at Boston, Massachusetts and based at New London, Connecticut whence she operated from 25 September until detached for two months duty with the Navy on 7 September 1933. On 10 November, she returned to New London and resumed operations for the Treasury Department. On 20 April 1934, the destroyer was returned to the Navy and was recommissioned as an experimental ship in accordance with the London Treaty limiting naval armament.

Although not officially redesignated as an auxiliary ship, AG-24, until 1 July 1935, Semmes was assigned to Experimental Division 1 and, with assigned submarines, tested and evaluated underwater sound equipment into the 1940s. In May 1939, Semmes took part in the recovery efforts for the submarine Squalus.

Semmes was fitted with the XAR air search radar in July, 1941 This was the prototype for the SC, SA, and SK series of radars.

After the entry of the United States into World War II, Semmes added escort missions, training services for the Key West Sound School, and antisubmarine patrol work to her duties.

At Key West from 16 March-16 April 1942, she performed escort and patrol work off the mid-Atlantic seaboard into May; and, on the morning of the 6th, while patrolling off Cape Lookout, collided with a British armed trawler, Senateur Duhamel. The latter sank; and, after assisting the survivors, Semmes put into Morehead City, North Carolina, for temporary repairs.

Permanent repairs were completed at Norfolk on 3 June and the former destroyer resumed her test and evaluation, patrol, and escort work which she continued through the end of the war in Europe. After the capitulation of Germany, Semmes resumed her primary mission of testing experimental equipment and, for the remainder of her career, conducted tests for the Underwater Sound Laboratory, New London, Connecticut, as a unit of the antisubmarine surface group of the Operational Development Force. Other duties during that period included the provision of training services to the Submarine School and to the Fleet Sonar School.

Semmes can be seen briefly as AG-24 in the 1943 movie Crash Dive, filmed at the Submarine Base New London.

=== Fate ===
On 21 May 1946, Semmes again entered the Philadelphia Navy Yard for inactivation. Decommissioned on 2 June, her name was struck from the Navy list on 3 July; and her hulk was sold for scrapping to the Northern Metals Corporation, Philadelphia on 25 November. She was scrapped the following year.

== Awards ==
Semmes received five battle stars for service in World War II.
