= IEEE Medal of Honor =

Award presented by the Institute of Electrical and Electronics Engineers

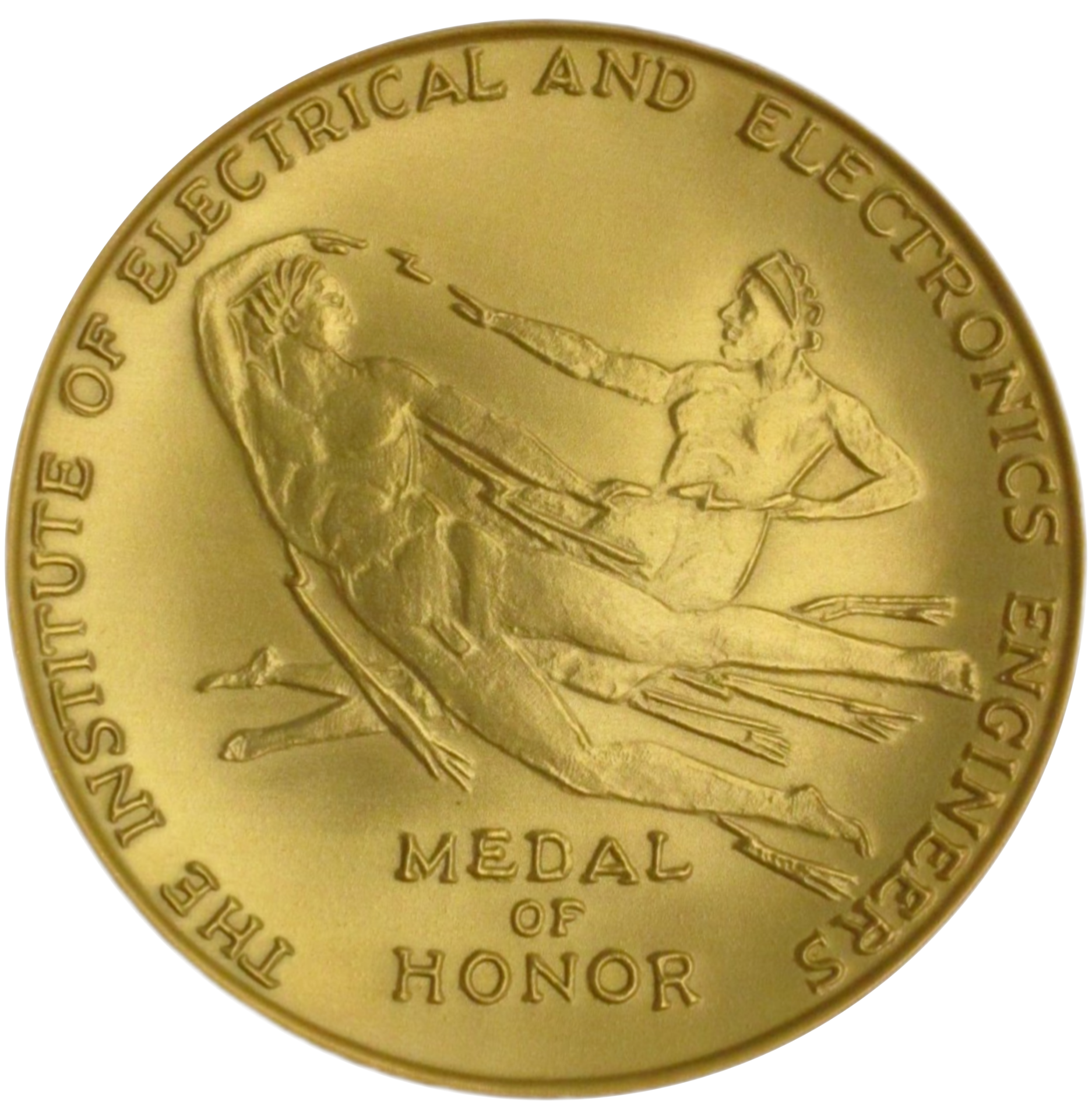
- Awarded for: Exceptional contributions or extraordinary careers in technology, engineering, and science in the IEEE fields of interest
- Presented by: Institute of Electrical and Electronics Engineers
- Reward: US$2,000,000
- First award: 1917
- Website: corporate-awards.ieee.org/ieee-medal-of-honor/

The IEEE Medal of Honor is the highest recognition of the Institute of Electrical and Electronics Engineers (IEEE). It has been awarded since 1917, and is presented to "an individual or team of up to three who have made exceptional contributions or had extraordinary careers in technology, engineering, and science in the IEEE fields of interest." The award consists of a gold medal, a bronze replica (of the medal), a certificate, and a US$2 million honorarium (increased from US$50,000 in 2025).

The medal was created by the Institute of Radio Engineers (IRE) as the IRE Medal of Honor. It became the IEEE Medal of Honor when the IRE merged with the American Institute of Electrical Engineers (AIEE) to form the IEEE in 1963. It was decided that IRE's Medal of Honor would be presented as IEEE's highest award. Edward Field Sanford Jr., an American sculptor, designed the medal in 1917.

The first recipient was Edwin Howard Armstrong, in 1917. As of 2026, 106 people have been awarded the medal, with the latest recipient being Jensen Huang. Only one woman, Mildred Dresselhaus, has been awarded the medal, in 2015.

== Recipients ==
Recipients of the IEEE Medal of Honor
Year	Name	Image	Citation	Ref.
1917	Edwin Howard Armstrong	A headshot of Edwin Howard Armstrong, taken around 1934	"In recognition of his work and publications dealing with the action of the oscillating and non-oscillating audio"	
1918	No award			
1919	Ernst Alexanderson	A headshot of Ernst Alexanderson, taken in 1920	"In recognition of his pioneer accomplishments in the field of long distance radio communication, including his development of the radio frequency alternator which bears his name, a magnetic amplifier permitting effective modulation of the output of such an alternator, and a cascade radio frequency vacuum tube amplifier yielding exceptional total amplification"	
1920	Guglielmo Marconi	A headshot of Guglielmo Marconi, taken in 1908	"In recognition of his pioneer work in radio telegraphy"	
1921	Reginald Aubrey Fessenden	A headshot of Reginald Fessenden, from 1903	(No citation)	
1922	Lee de Forest	A headshot of Lee De Forest, from 1904	"For his major contributions to the communications arts and sciences, as particularly exemplified by his invention of that outstandingly significant device: the three electrode vacuum tube, and his work in the fields of radio telephonic transmission and reception"	
1923	John Stone Stone	A headshot of John Stone Stone, from 1905	"For his valuable pioneer contributions to the radio art"	
1924	Michael I. Pupin	Mihajlo Pupin, from 1890	"In recognition of his fundamental contributions in the field of electrical tuning and the rectification of alternating currents used for signaling purposes"	
1925	No award			
1926	Greenleaf Whittier Pickard	Greenleaf Whittier Pickard, in his laboratory, from 1922	"For his contributions to crystal detectors, coil antennas, wave propagation and atmospheric disturbances"	
1927	Louis W. Austin	A headshot of Louis Winslow Austin, from around 1918	"For his pioneer work in the quantitative measurement and correlation of factors involved in radio wave transmission"	
1928	Jonathan Zenneck	A headshot of Jonathan Zenneck, from 1951	"For his contribution to original researches in radio circuit performance and to the scientific and educational contributions to the literature of the pioneer radio art"	
1929	George W. Pierce	A headshot of GeorgeWashingtonPierce, circa 1892	"For his major contributions in the theory and operation of crystal detectors, piezoelectric crystals and magnetostriction frequency controls and magnetostriction devices for the production of sound; and for his instructional leadership as a teacher and as a writer of important texts in the electric wave field"	
1930	Peder Oluf Pedersen	—	(No citation)	
1931	Gustave A. Ferrie	A headshot of Gustave Ferrié, with a military cap, from 1932	"For his pioneer work in the up building of radio communication in France and in the world, his long continued leadership in the communication field, and his outstanding contributions to the organization of international cooperation in radio"	
1932	Arthur Edwin Kennelly	A headshot of Arthur Edwin Kennelly, from 1915	"For his studies of radio propagation phenomena and his contributions to the theory and measurement methods in the alternating current circuit field which now have extensive radio application"	
1933	John Ambrose Fleming	A headshot of John Ambrose Fleming, from 1890	"For the conspicuous part he played in introducing physical and engineering principles into the radio art"	
1934	Stanford C. Hooper	Stanford Caldwell Hooper, in his Navy uniform, from 1922	"For the orderly planning and systematic organization of radio communication in the Government Service with which he is associated (United States Navy), and the concomitant and resulting advances in the development of radio equipment and procedure"	
1935	Balthasar van der Pol	A headshot of Balthasar van der Pol, from 1939	"For his fundamental studies and contributions in the field of circuit theory and electromagnetic wave propagation phenomena"	
1936	George Ashley Campbell	—	"For his contributions to the theory of electrical network"	
1937	Melville Eastham	—	"For his pioneer work in the field of radio measurements, his constructive influence on laboratory practice in communication engineering, and his unfailing support of the aims and ideals of the Institute"	
1938	John H. Dellinger	A headshot of John Howard Dellinger, from 1908	"For his contributions to the development of radio measurements and standards, his researches and discoveries of the relation between radio wave propagation and other natural phenomena, and his leadership in international conferences contributing to the world wide cooperation in telecommunications"	
1939	Albert G. Lee	—	"For his accomplishments in promoting international radio services and in fostering advances in the art and science of radio communication"	
1940	Lloyd Espenschied	—	"For his accomplishments as an engineer, as an inventor, as a pioneer in the development of radio telephony, and for his effective contributions to the progress of international radio coordination"	
1941	Alfred Norton Goldsmith	Photo of Goldsmith, from 1922	"For his contributions to radio research, engineering, and commercial development, his leadership in standardization, and his unceasing devotion to the establishment and upbuilding of the Institute and its Proceedings"	
1942	Albert H. Taylor	Albert Hoyt Taylor, holding a pipe, from 1945	"For his contributions to radio communication as an engineer and organizer, including pioneering work in the practical application of piezoelectric control to radio transmitters, early recognition and investigation of skip distances and other high-frequency wave-propagation problems, and many years of service to the government of the United States as an engineering executive of outstanding ability in directing the Radio Division of the Naval Research Laboratory"	
1943	William Wilson	—	"For his achievements in the development of modern electronics, including its application to radio-telephony, and for his contributions to the welfare and work of the Institute"	
1944	Haraden Pratt	—	"In recognition of his engineering contributions to the development of radio, of his work in the extension of communication facilities to distant lands, and of his constructive leadership in Institute affairs"	
1945	Harold H. Beverage	A headshot of Harold Beverage, from 1915	"In recognition of his achievements in radio research and invention, of his practical applications of engineering developments that greatly extended and increased the efficiency of domestic and world-wide radio communications and of his devotion to the affairs of the Institute of Radio Engineers"	
1946	Ralph Hartley	A headshot of Ralph Hartley	"For his early work on oscillating circuits employing triode tubes and likewise for his early recognition and clear exposition of the fundamental relationship between the total amount of information which may be transmitted over a transmission system of limited band-width and the time required"	
1947	No award			
1948	Lawrence C. F. Horle		"For his contributions to the radio industry in standardization work, both in peace and war, particularly in the field of electron tubes, and for his guidance of a multiplicity of technical committees into effective action"	
1949	Ralph Bown	—	"For his extensive contributions to the field of radio and for his leadership in Institute affairs"	
1950	Frederick Terman	—	"For his many contributions to the radio and electronic industry as teacher, author, scientist and administrator"	
1951	Vladimir Zworykin	A headshot of Vladimir Zworykin, from 1956	"For his outstanding contributions to the concept and development of electronic apparatus basic to modern television, and his scientific achievements that led to fundamental advances in the application of electronics to communications, to industry and to national security"	
1952	Walter R. G. Baker	A headshot of Walter R G Baker, from 1954	"In recognition of his outstanding direction of scientific and engineering projects; for his statesmanship in reconciling conflicting viewpoints and obtaining cooperative effort; and for his service to the Institute"	
1953	John Milton Miller	John Milton Miller, with his instruments, from 1922	"In recognition of his pioneering contributions to the fundamentals of electron tube theory and measurements, to crystal controlled oscillators and to receiver development"	
1954	William L. Everitt	William Littell Everitt	"For his distinguished career as author, educator and scientist; for his contributions in establishing electronics and communications as a major branch of electrical engineering; for his unselfish service to his country; for his leadership in the affairs of The Institute of Radio Engineers"	
1955	Harald T. Friis	—	"For his outstanding technical contributions in the expansion of the useful spectrum of radio frequencies, and for the inspiration and leadership he has given to young engineers"	
1956	John V. L. Hogan	A headshot of John Vincent Lawless Hogan, from 1922	"For his contributions to the electronic field as a founder and builder of The Institute of Radio Engineers, for the long sequence of his inventions, and for his continuing activity in the development of devices and systems useful in the communications art"	
1957	Julius Adams Stratton	—	"For his inspiring leadership and outstanding contributions to the development of radio engineering, as teacher, physicist, engineer, author and administrator"	
1958	Albert Hull	A headshot of Albert Hull, from 1921	"For outstanding scientific achievement and pioneering inventions and development in the field of electron tubes"	
1959	Emory Leon Chaffee	A headshot of E. Leon Chaffee	"For his outstanding research contributions and his dedication to training for leadership in radio engineering"	
1960	Harry Nyquist	—	"For fundamental contributions to a quantitative understanding of thermal noise, data transmission and negative feedback"	
1961	Ernst A. Guillemin	—	"For outstanding scientific and engineering achievements"	
1962	Edward Victor Appleton	A headshot of Edward Victor Appleton, from 1947	"For his distinguished pioneer work in investigating the ionosphere by means of radio waves"	
1963	John Hays Hammond Jr.	A headshot of John Hays Hammond Jr., from 1922	"For pioneering contributions to circuit theory and practice, to the radio control of missiles and to basic communication methods"	
1963	George C. Southworth	—	"For pioneering contributions to microwave radio physics, to radio astronomy, and to waveguide transmission"	
1964	Harold A. Wheeler	—	"For his analyses of the fundamental limitations on the resolution in television systems and on wideband amplifiers, and for his basic contributions to the theory and development of antennas, microwave elements, circuits, and receivers"	
1965	No award			
1966	Claude Elwood Shannon	A headshot of Claude Shannon	"For his development of a mathematical theory of communication which unified and significantly advanced the state of the art"	
1967	Charles H. Townes	A headshot of Charles Townes	"For his significant contributions in the field of quantum electronics which have led to the maser and the laser"	
1968	Gordon K. Teal	—	"For his contributions to single crystal germanium and silicon technology and the single crystal grown junction transistor"	
1969	Edward Ginzton	—	"For his outstanding contributions in advancing the technology of high power klystrons and their application, especially to linear particle accelerators"	
1970	Dennis Gabor	A headshot of Dennis Gabor, from 1971	"For his ingenious and exciting discovery and verification of the principles of holography"	
1971	John Bardeen	A headshot of John Bardeen, from 1956	"For his profound contributions to the understanding of the conductivity of solids, to the invention of the transistor, and to the microscopic theory of superconductivity"	
1972	Jay W. Forrester	—	"For exceptional advances in the digital computer through his invention and application of the magnetic-core random-access memory, employing coincident current addressing"	
1973	Rudolf Kompfner	—	"For a major contribution to world-wide communication through the conception of the traveling-wave tube embodying a new principle of amplification"	
1974	Rudolf Kálmán	A headshot of Rudolf Kalman, from 2009	"For pioneering modern methods in system theory, including concepts of controllability, observability, filtering, and algebraic structures"	
1975	John Robinson Pierce	A headshot of John Robinson Pierce	"For his pioneering concrete proposals and the realization of satellite communication experiments, and for contributions in theory and design of traveling wave tubes and in electron beam optics essential to this success"	
1976	No award			
1977	H. Earle Vaughan	—	"For his vision, technical contributions and leadership in the development of the first high-capacity pulse-code modulation time-division telephone switching system"	
1978	Robert Noyce	A headshot of Robert Noyce, from 1959	"For his contributions to the silicon integrated circuit, a cornerstone of modern electronics"	
1979	Richard Bellman	—	"For contributions to decision processes and control system theory, particularly the creation and application of dynamic programming"	
1980	William Shockley	A headshot of William Shockley, from 1975	"For the invention of the junction transistor, the analog and the junction field-effect transistor, and the theory underlying their operation"	
1981	Sidney Darlington	—	"For fundamental contributions to filtering and signal processing leading to chirp radar"	
1982	John Tukey	—	"For his contributions to the spectral analysis of random processes and the fast Fourier transform algorithm"	
1983	Nicolaas Bloembergen	A headshot of Nicolaas Bloembergen, from 1981	"For pioneering contributions to Quantum Electronics including the invention of the three-level maser"	
1984	Norman F. Ramsey	A headshot of Norman Ramsey	"For fundamental contributions to very high accuracy time and frequency standards exemplified by the cesium atomic clock and hydrogen maser oscillator"	
1985	John Roy Whinnery	A headshot of Whinnery Dean	"For seminal contributions to the understanding and application of electromagnetic fields and waves to microwave, laser, and optical devices"	
1986	Jack Kilby	—	"For fundamental contributions to semiconductor integrated circuit technology"	
1987	Paul Lauterbur	—	"For the discovery of nuclear magnetic resonance imaging"	
1988	Calvin Quate	—	"For the invention and development of the scanning acoustic microscope"	
1989	C. Kumar Patel	A headshot of C. Kumar N. Patel	"For fundamental contributions to quantum electronics, including the carbon dioxide laser and the spin-flip Raman laser"	
1990	Robert G. Gallager	A headshot of Robert Gallager, from 2014	"For fundamental contributions to communications coding techniques"	
1991	Leo Esaki	A headshot of Leo Esaki, from 1959	"For contributions to and leadership in tunneling, semiconductor superlattices, and quantum wells"	
1992	Amos E. Joel Jr.	—	"For fundamental contributions to and leadership in telecommunications switching systems"	
1993	Karl Johan Åström	—	"For fundamental contributions to theory and applications of adaptive control technology"	
1994	Alfred Y. Cho	—	"For seminal contributions to the development of molecular beam epitaxy"	
1995	Lotfi A. Zadeh		"For pioneering development of fuzzy logic and its many diverse applications"	
1996	Robert Metcalfe	A headshot of Robert Metcalfe, from 2004	"For exemplary and sustained leadership in the development, standardization, and commercialization of Ethernet"	
1997	George H. Heilmeier	A headshot of George H. Heilmeier, from 2009	"For discovery and initial development of electro-optic effects in liquid crystals"	
1998	Donald Pederson	—	"For creation of the SPICE Program, universally used for the computer aided design of circuits"	
1999	Charles Concordia	—	"For outstanding contributions in the area of Power System Dynamics which resulted in substantial improvements in planning, operation and security of extended power systems" "	
2000	Andrew Grove	A headshot of Andrew Grove, from 1997	"For pioneering research in characterizing and modeling metal oxide semiconductor devices and technology, and leadership in the development of the modern semiconductor industry"	
2001	Herwig Kogelnik	A headshot of Herwig Kogelnik, from 2009	"For fundamental contributions to the science and technology of lasers and optoelectronics, and for leadership in research and development of photonics and lightwave communication systems"	
2002	Herbert Kroemer	A headshot of Herbert Kroemer, from 2008	"For contributions to high-frequency transistors and hot electron devices, especially heterostructure devices from heterostructure bipolar transistors to lasers, and their molecular beam epitaxy technology"	
2003	Nick Holonyak	A headshot of Nick Holonyak Jr., taken around 2002	"For a career of pioneering contributions to semiconductors, including the growth of semiconductor alloys and heterojunctions, and to visible light-emitting diodes and injection lasers"	
2004	Tadahiro Sekimoto	—	"For contributions to digital satellite communications, promotion of information technology R&D, and technical and corporate leadership in computers and communications"	
2005	James Flanagan	—	"For sustained leadership and outstanding contributions in speech technology"	
2006	James D. Meindl	—	"For pioneering contributions to microelectronics, including low power, biomedical, physical limits and onchip interconnect networks"	
2007	Thomas Kailath	—	"For exceptional development of powerful algorithms in the fields of communications, computing, control and signal processing"	
2008	Gordon Moore	A headshot of Gordon Moore, from 1978	"For pioneering technical roles in integrated-circuit processing, and leadership in the development of MOS memory, the microprocessor computer and the semiconductor industry"	
2009	Robert Dennard	A headshot of Robert Dennard	"For invention of the single transistor Dynamic Random Access Memory and for developing scaling principles for integrated circuits"	
2010	Andrew Viterbi	A headshot of Andrew Viterbi, from 2005	"For seminal contributions to communications technology and theory"	
2011	Morris Chang	A headshot of MorrisChang, from 2022	"For outstanding leadership in the semiconductor industry"	
2012	John L. Hennessy	A headshot of John L Hennessy, from 2007	"For pioneering the RISC processor architecture and for leadership in computer engineering and higher education"	
2013	Irwin M. Jacobs	Irwin Jacobs, behind a podium, from 2005	"For leadership and fundamental contributions to digital communications and wireless technology"	
2014	B. Jayant Baliga	A headshot of Jayant Baliga, from 2021	"For the invention, implementation, and commercialization of power semiconductor devices with widespread benefits to society"	
2015	Mildred Dresselhaus	A headshot of Mildred Dresselhaus, from 2012	"For leadership and contributions across many fields of science and engineering"	
2016	Dave Forney	—	"For pioneering contributions to the theory of error-correcting codes and the development of reliable high-speed data communications"	
2017	Kees Schouhamer Immink	Kees Schouhamer Immink, from 2004	"For pioneering contributions to video, audio, and data recording technology, including compact disc, DVD, and Blu-ray"	
2018	Bradford W. Parkinson	A headshot of US Air Force Colonel in uniform	"For fundamental contributions to and leadership in developing the design and driving the early applications of the Global Positioning System"	
2019	Kurt E. Peterson	A headshot of Kurt Peterson, from 2019	"For contributions to and leadership in the development and commercialization of innovative technologies in the field of MEMS (micro-electromechanical systems)"	
2020	Chenming Hu	A headshot of Chenming Hu, from 2023	"For a distinguished career of developing and putting into practice semiconductor models, particularly 3-D device structures, that have helped keep Moore’s Law going over many decades"	
2021	Yaakov Ziv	A headshot of Jacob Ziv, from 2009	"For fundamental contributions to information theory and data compression technology, and for distinguished research leadership"	
2022	Asad M. Madni	—	"For pioneering contributions to the development and commercialization of innovative sensing and systems technologies, and for distinguished research leadership"	
2023	Vinton G. Cerf	Balding man, in a three-piece suit	"For co-creating the Internet architecture and providing sustained leadership in its phenomenal growth in becoming society’s critical infrastructure"	
2024	Robert E. Kahn	Bob Kahn, in a tweed coat	"For pioneering technical and leadership contributions in packet communication technologies and foundations of the Internet"	
2025	Henry Samueli	Henry Samueli wearing a black suit presenting a black hockey jersey labeled "Bush 07" to President George W. Bush.	"For pioneering research and commercialization of broadband communication and networking technologies, and promotion of STEM education"	
2026	Jensen Huang	Jensen Huang in White House	"For leadership in the development of graphics processing units and their application to scientific computing and artificial intelligence."	

== See also ==
- IET Faraday Medal
- Queen Elizabeth Prize for Engineering
- List of engineering awards
