= Hazeltine Corporation =

American defense electronics company

- Final logo by Lippincott & Margulies from 1970 to 1986.
- Industry: Electronics
- Founded: 1924; 102 years ago in Greenlawn, New York
- Founder: Dr. Louis Alan Hazeltine
- Defunct: 1986; 40 years ago
- Fate: Acquired by Emerson Electric Company and spun-off several times

Hazeltine Corporation was an American defense electronics company, active from 1924 until 1986. It was acquired in 1986 by the Emerson Electric Company, and is part of BAE Systems Inc. since 1999.

== History ==
=== 1924–1986 ===
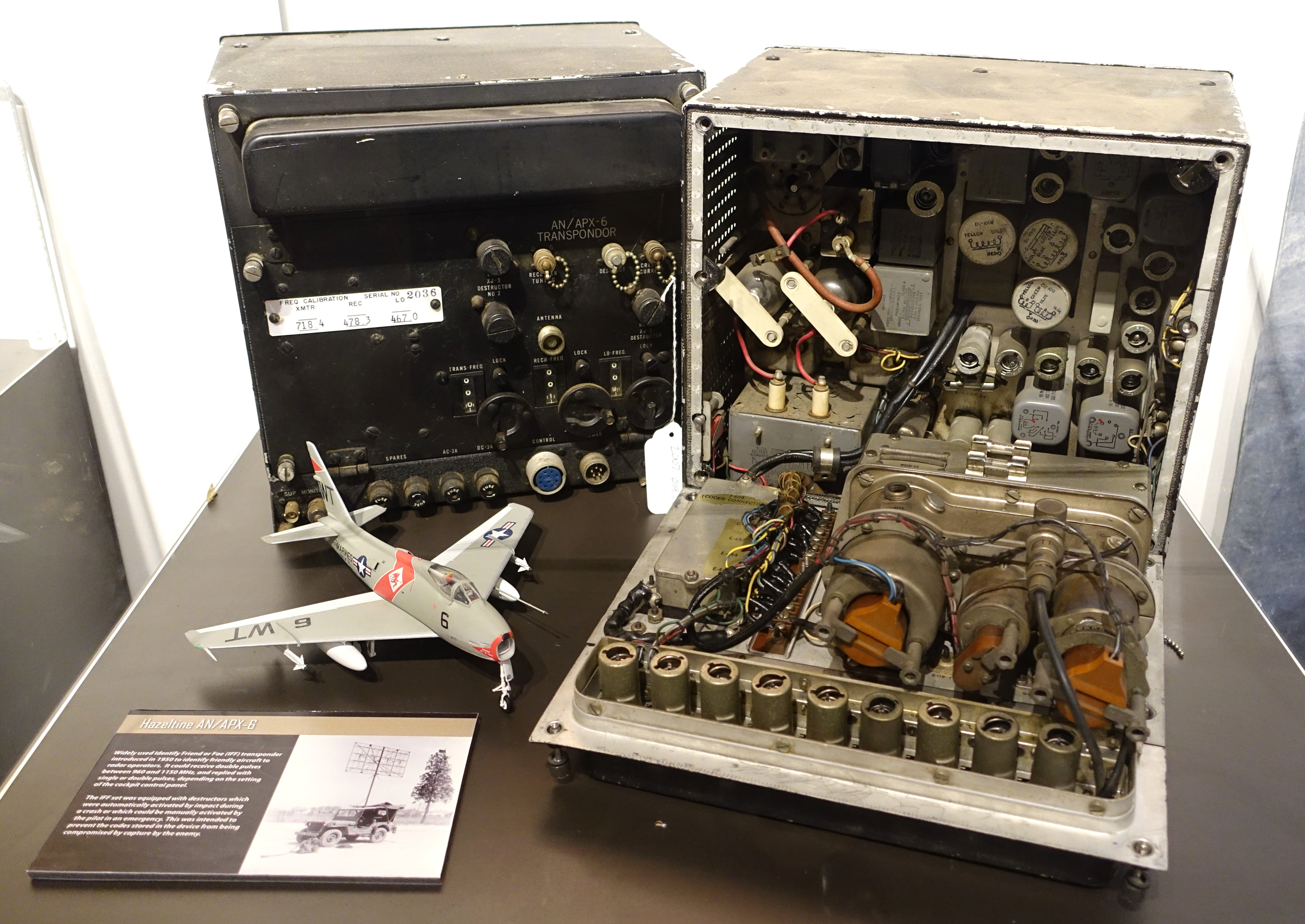
Hazeltine AN-APX-6 Identification Friend or Foe (IFF) transponder, introduced 1950

The company was founded in 1924 by investors to exploit the Neutrodyne patent of Dr. Louis Alan Hazeltine. Headquartered in Greenlawn, Long Island, New York, since 1955, it had facilities in several other locations in Long Island, including its Wheeler Laboratories facility in Smithtown, New York, manufacturing plants in Riverhead and Little Neck, NY, and a division in Braintree, Massachusetts. Hazeltine Corporation employed 2,600 people by 1981.

The company was created primarily to administer and license Hazeltine’s Neutrodyne patents to radio manufacturers. Through these licenses the Hazeltine Corporation received royalties on large numbers of broadcast receivers produced during the early 1920s, when the neutrodyne circuit became one of the dominant commercial receiver designs. The licensing program made the company one of the earliest examples of a technology firm organized around patent licensing rather than manufacturing; see Patents and licensing in early radio.

The company originally concentrated on the design of electronic circuits and the licensing of patents. Innovations in radio, monochrome and later color television components allowed the company to grow. One particularly lucrative design was the Automatic Gain Control circuit. This was such a useful feature that almost every AM radio made used this feature, by license from Hazeltine, from about 1930 until the patent expired. Hazeltine Corporation also developed and licensed many of the basic concepts of the NTSC color television system.

From 1955 to 1959 the president of the Hazeltine Company was Philip La Follette, former three-term governor of Wisconsin and son of "Fighting Bob" La Follette, who campaigned for president in 1924 as the Progressive Party candidate.

The company flourished into the 1980s as a United States Federal defense contractor with particular success as a designer and manufacturer of "Identification Friend or Foe" (IFF) military detection and identification systems.

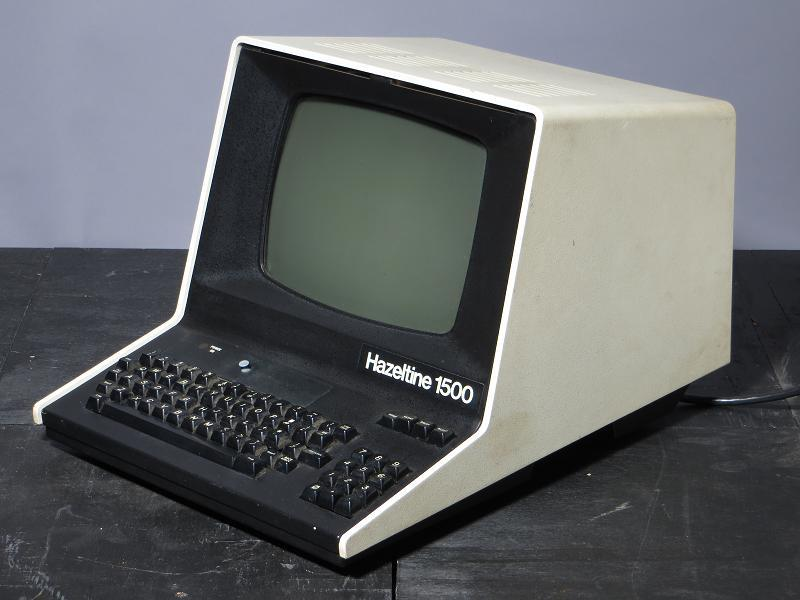
Hazeltine 1500 computer terminal from 1977

During the 1970s, as an outgrowth of its defense work, Hazeltine Corp. developed the Hazeltine Terminal, an early monochrome smart terminal. Several improved models followed, including the popular Hazeltine 1500, which found use in the emerging microcomputer market in the late 1970s. The company eventually sold the terminal line to a short-lived third party called Esprit, which was managed by former Hazeltine employees.

Hazeltine Corporation's terminal division was spun off into Esprit Systems in January 1983. The name of the spin-off refers to the Hazeltine Esprit terminal, which division management felt Hazeltine was not properly marketing.

=== 1986–present ===
Hazeltine was acquired by the Emerson Electric Company in 1986.

In 1990, Emerson spun off its Government and Defense Group, including Hazeltine, to form ESCO Electronics Corporation.

Wordmark of GEC-Marconi Hazeltine

In 1996, Hazeltine was acquired from ESCO by GEC-Marconi Electronic Systems Corp., a US subsidiary of The General Electric Company, and renamed GEC-Marconi Hazeltine. ESCO was represented by investment banking firm Quarterdeck Investment Partners, Inc. in a deal which valued Hazeltine at $110 million.

With the 1999 merger of GEC-Marconi and British Aerospace to form BAE Systems, GEC-Marconi Hazeltine was renamed BAE Systems Advanced Systems. In 2002, it was renamed BAE Systems CNIR (Communication, Navigation, Identification and Reconnaissance).

In a 2007 reorganization, the division was folded into BAE Systems Electronics and Integrated Solutions and is currently known as BAE Systems Sensor Systems.
