= William Wilson (physicist) =

English-born physicist (1887–1948)

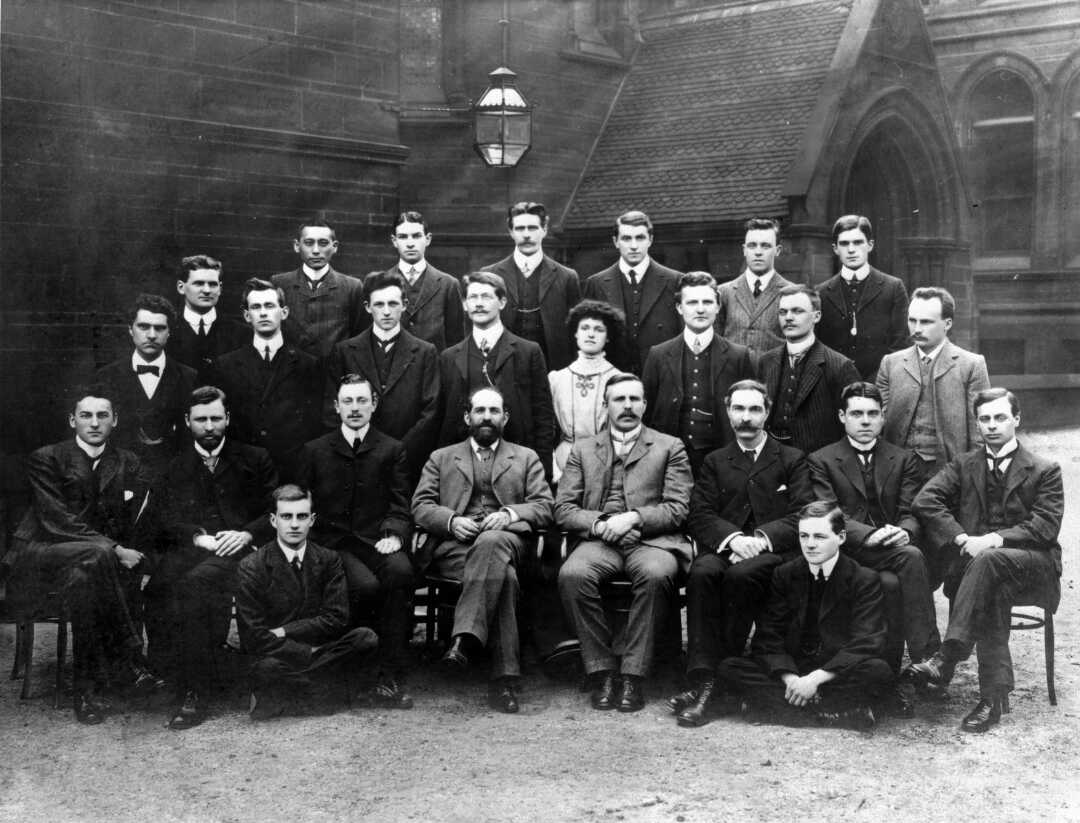
Wilson in 1910 (middle row, third from left).

William Wilson (March 29, 1887 – May 8, 1948) was born in Preston, England. he studied at the University of Manchester, Cambridge University, and Giessen in Germany receiving his B.Sc. degree in 1907, his M.Sc. in 1908, and his D.Sc. in 1913 While at Cambridge University he studied radioactivity under Sir Ernest Rutherford. Between the years 1912 and 1914, he became a lecturer at the University of Toronto before joining Western Electric Company and the Bell Laboratories in 1915. During this year he was also given the task of setting up radio receiving stations to listen for signals of an experimental transmitter stationed in Arlington Virginia. The test was successful. In 1918, Wilson was put in charge of the research, development, and manufacturing of vacuum tubes for the U.S. Government, and then of radio research and development and design of transatlantic radiotelephones in 1925. It was also during this time that resulted in the development of short-wave radio telephone systems for communication with Europe. In 1927, he accepted the position of Assistant Director of Research as well as was put in charge of researching solutions to wire communication problems in 1934. In 1936, Wilson was promoted to Assistant Vice President and placed in charge of the Personnel and Publication Departments.

In 1926, Wilson joined the Institute of Radio Engineers, becoming a Fellow in 1928. Between 1932 and 1936 he also was, for said Institute, a member or chairman of the Board of Directors, Board of Editors, Awards, Bibliography, Convention, Nominations, Sections, Papers, and Standards. Wilson was awarded the IEEE Medal of Honor in the January 28th, 1943 Winter Conference, "for his achievements in the development of modern electronics, including its application to radiotelephony and for his contributions to the welfare and work of the Institute". He was also an elected member of Sigma Xi, and a member of the ASA and American Physical Society. In 1942, he briefly retired due to poor health but later taught physics at North Carolina State College once he recovered. Three years late, he died in Raleigh, North Carolina on May 8th, 1948.

Outside of work, Wilson was also a member of the Salmagundi Club and participated in amateur dramatic work at the Christ Episcopal Church in Short Hills. He married an Ada Eldin and had three sons named William, David, and Stephen.
