= USS Algorma (AT-34) =

Tugboat of the United States Navy

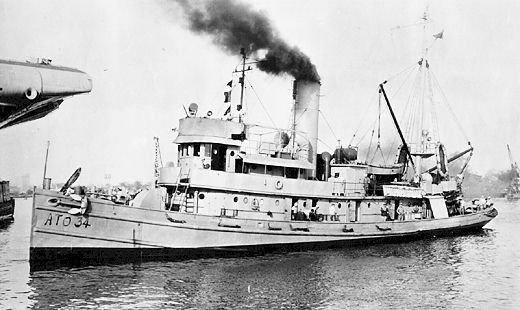
- USS Algorma (AT-34) providing tug service to an unidentified aircraft carrier, date and place unknown.

History

United States
- Name: USS Algorma (AT-34)
- Builder: Staten Island Shipbuilding Co., Port Richmond, NY
- Laid down: 6 January 1919
- Launched: 12 June 1919
- Commissioned: 15 May 1920
- Decommissioned: 3 May 1922
- Recommissioned: 28 September 1924
- Decommissioned: 18 June 1946
- Stricken: 31 July 1946
- Fate: Transferred to the Maritime Commission, 14 January 1947 for disposal

General characteristics
- Displacement: 998 t
- Length: 156 ft 8 in (47.75 m)
- Beam: 30 ft (9.1 m)
- Draft: 14 ft 7 in (4.45 m)
- Propulsion: single screw
- Speed: 13.6 knots (25.2 km/h; 15.7 mph)
- Complement: 44
- Armament: one machine gun

The first USS Algorma (AT-34) was laid down on 6 January 1919 at Port Richmond, NY, by the Staten Island Shipbuilding Co.; launched on 12 June 1919; and commissioned on 15 May 1920 at the New York Navy Yard, Brooklyn, NY.

Following her commissioning, the tug was assigned to duty in the 3rd Naval District. On 17 July 1920, she received the alphanumeric designation AT-34. In January 1921, the ship was reassigned to the 5th Naval District, homeported at Norfolk, VA., and carried out towing operations there until 12 September 1921. She sailed from Hampton Roads for the Canal Zone on that day and reached Coco Solo on 28 September. She then began operations between Coco Solo and San Diego, California, carrying out towing duties. In April 1922, the vessel left the Canal Zone and proceeded to the Mare Island Navy Yard, Vallejo, California, where she arrived on 29 March 1922 and began deactivation preparations. The tug was placed out of commission at Mare Island on 3 May 1922.

Algorma was recommissioned there on 29 September 1924. She was assigned to Fleet Base Force, Train Squadron 2, Battle Fleet, and provided services as a tender to aircraft and towed targets and carried put routine towing duty along the California coast. The highlight of her service during this period was a mission of mercy late in June 1925, when the tug carried emergency supplies to victims of the 1925 Santa Barbara earthquake. Algorma continued her west coast operations through 30 June 1941, when she left San Diego and returned to the east coast.

The tug reported to the Atlantic Fleet on 14 July 1941 and briefly operated in the Caribbean before arriving in Norfolk on 13.August. During late August and early September, she acted as a target towing vessel during exercises held off the coast of Maine. Upon completion of this assignment, the ship returned to Norfolk and remained in the Hampton Roads area through June 1942 performing various towing duties.

In July 1942, Algorma sailed to the Caribbean and participated in fleet exercises, towing targets for vessels and shore batteries. She also carried out antisubmarine patrols. Among her ports of call were San Juan, Puerto Rico; Charlotte Amalie, United States Virgin Islands; Trinidad; Guantánamo Bay, Cuba; and Willemstad, Netherlands Antilles. She returned to Norfolk in December 1943 for overhaul.

The tug sailed in a convoy bound for England on 25 January 1944. She arrived at Falmouth, Cornwall on 15 February and assumed duties as a patrol, escort, and towing vessel. The ship participated in the buildup of Allied forces for the invasion of northern France. On 15 May, her designation was changed to ATO-34. Following the invasion of France, Algorma assisted disabled vessels, took part in salvage operations, and carried out regular barge and lighter duty between Great Britain and France.

On 23 March 1945, the vessel joined a convoy at Belfast, Northern Ireland, and shaped a course for the east coast of the United States. She touched at New York City, NY, on 13 April. The tug continued down the east coast and entered the Norfolk Navy Yard for overhaul. Upon the completion of the yard period, she sailed, via the Panama Canal, for the west coast and arrived at San Francisco, Calif., on 25 August.

Algorma assumed regular towing duties with the Pacific Fleet while based at Treasure Island. This assignment occupied the vessel until she was decommissioned at Treasure Island on 18 June 1946. Her name was struck from the Navy list on 31 July 1946. The ship was transferred to the Maritime Commission on 14 January 1947 for disposal.

Algorma earned one battle star for her World War II service.
