= Louis Alan Hazeltine =

American physicist (1886–1964)

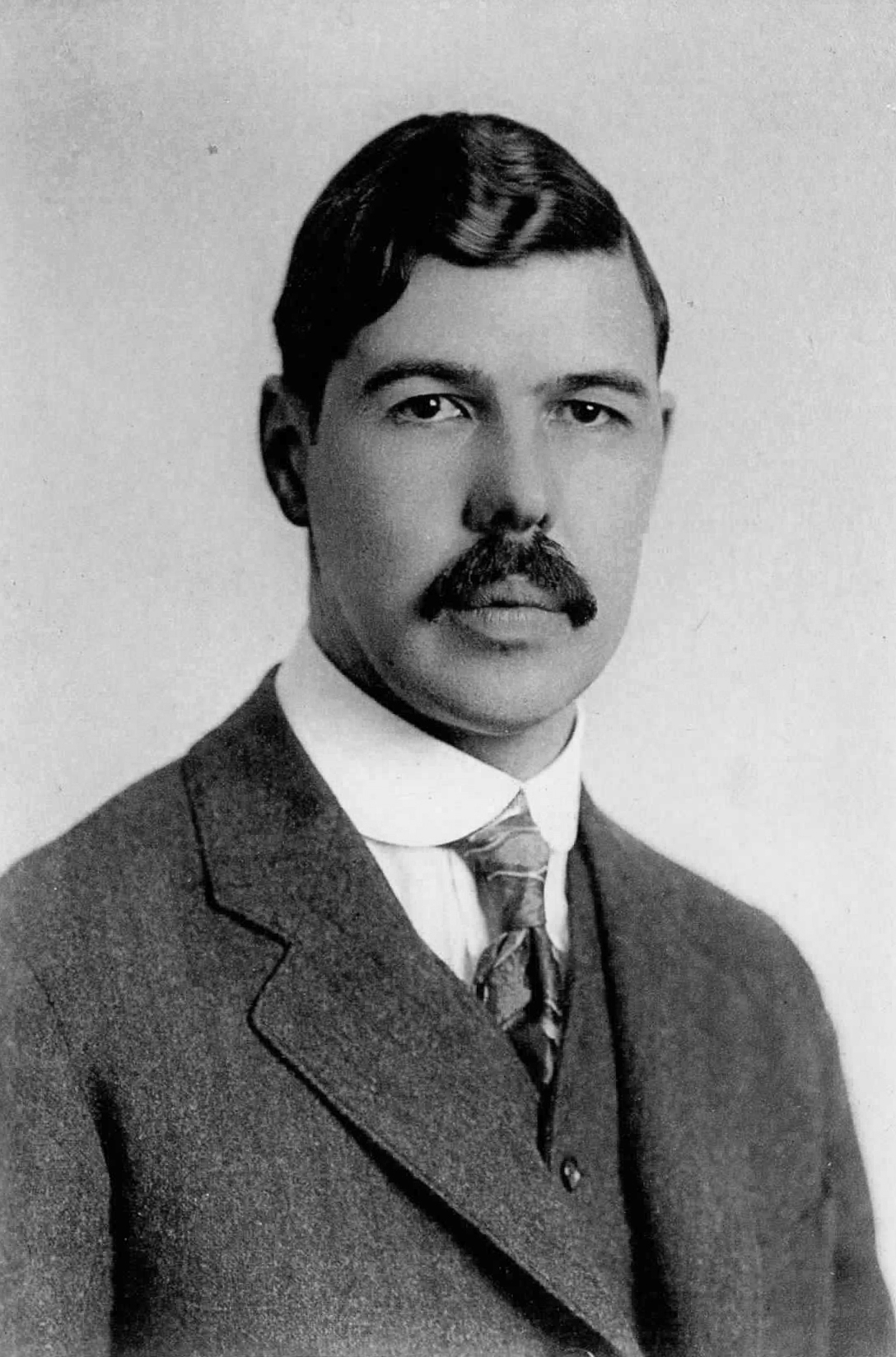
- Born: August 7, 1886; Morristown, New Jersey
- Died: May 24, 1964 (aged 77)
- Citizenship: USA
- Education: Stevens Institute of Technology
- Known for: Neutrodyne circuit
- Scientific career
- Fields: physics

Louis Alan Hazeltine (August 7, 1886 – May 24, 1964) was an engineer and physicist, the inventor of the Neutrodyne circuit, and the Hazeltine-Fremodyne Superregenerative circuit. He was the founder of the Hazeltine Corporation.

== Biography ==
Louis Alan Hazeltine was born in Morristown, New Jersey, in 1886 and attended the Stevens Institute of Technology in Hoboken, New Jersey, majoring in electrical engineering. He graduated in 1906 and accepted a job with General Electric corporation.

Hazeltine returned to Stevens to teach, eventually becoming chair of the electrical engineering department in 1917.

The following year he became a consultant for the United States Navy. The Navy job eventually parlayed into a position as an advisor to the U.S. government on radio broadcasting regulation, and later, a position on the National Defense Research Committee during World War II.

Hazeltine is best known for inventing the Neutrodyne radio receiver circuit in 1922, which neutralized interelectrode capacitance in triode amplifiers to prevent unwanted feedback and oscillation. The design allowed stable multi-stage radio-frequency amplification without using regenerative feedback and was widely licensed to radio manufacturers during the early 1920s; see Patents and licensing in early radio.

Hazeltine was president of the Institute of Radio Engineers in 1936.
