= Neutrodyne =

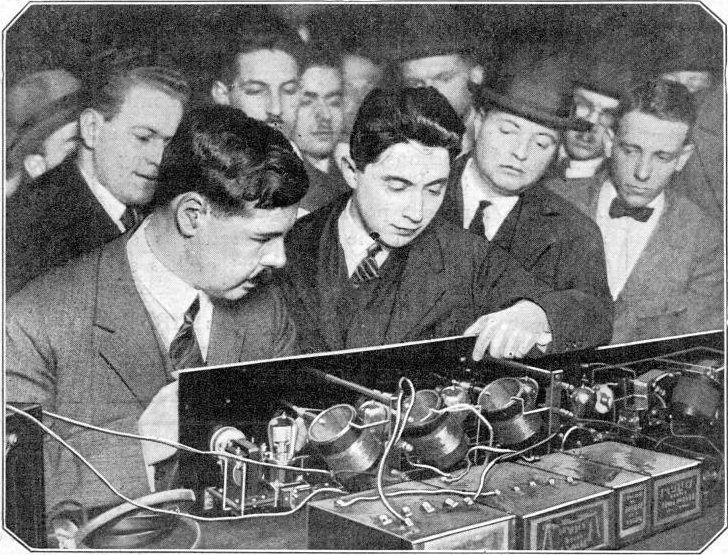
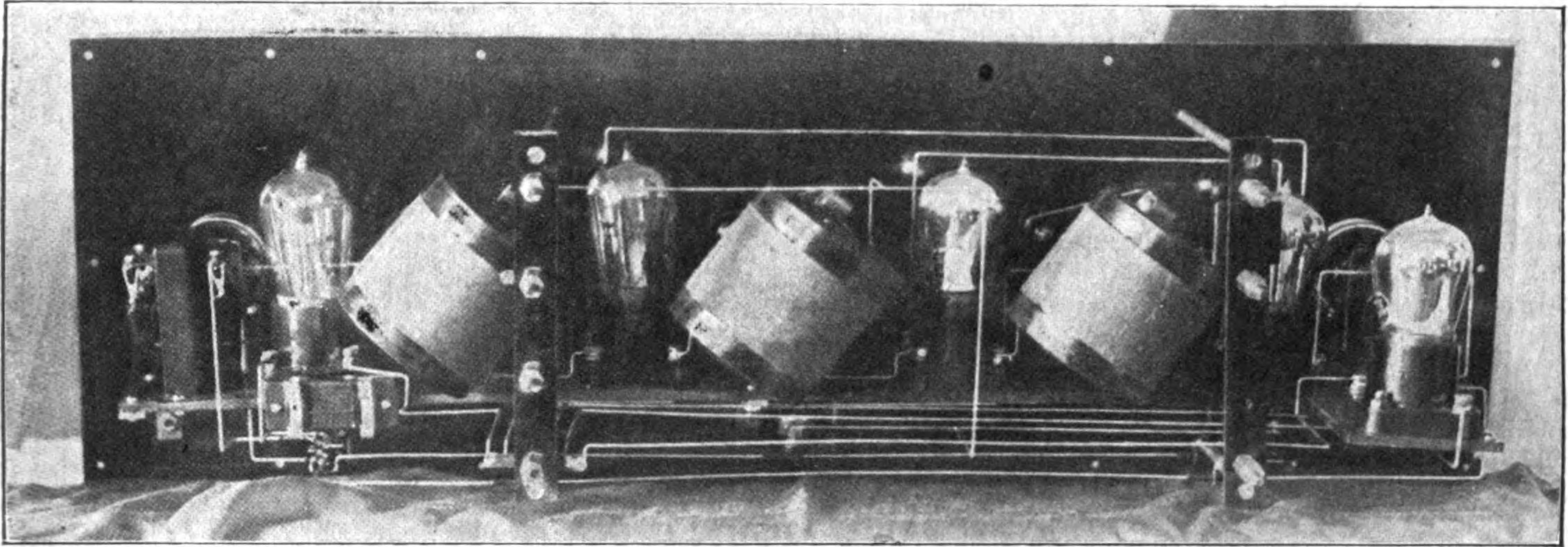
Hazeltine's prototype Neutrodyne receiver, presented at a March 2, 1923 meeting of the Radio Society of America at Columbia University. It had two stages of tuned radio frequency amplification. (closeup, bottom) The three interstage coupling coils, from which the neutralizing signal is taken, are visible.

The Neutrodyne radio receiver, invented in 1922 by Louis Hazeltine, was a particular type of tuned radio frequency (TRF) receiver, in which the instability-causing inter-electrode capacitance of the triode RF tubes is cancelled out or "neutralized" to prevent parasitic oscillations which caused "squealing" or "howling" noises in the speakers of early radio sets. In most designs, a small extra winding on each of the RF amplifiers' tuned anode coils was used to generate a small antiphase signal, which could be adjusted by special variable trim capacitors to cancel out the stray signal coupled to the grid via plate-to-grid capacitance. The Neutrodyne circuit was popular in radio receivers until the 1930s, when it was superseded by the superheterodyne receiver.

== History ==
Early tuned radio-frequency (TRF) receivers were difficult to operate at high gain because their RF amplifier stages were unstable. A major issue at the time was the high interelectrode capacitance of triode vacuum tubes, causing unintended feedback between plate and grid circuits. This often led to oscillation. These oscillations produced audible whistles or “howling,” a problem noted in contemporary training texts. The difficulty arose mainly from the electrical characteristics of the tubes then available, rather than from the TRF architecture itself.

Earlier work by Charles W. Rice at General Electric described tube amplifier circuits that intentionally applied an opposing voltage to cancel grid–plate capacitive coupling. This approach is now recognized as an early example of neutralization, but it was limited to specific tube stages and was not generalized as a circuit method.

To address the instability caused by interelectrode capacitance, Louis Hazeltine developed a method for canceling capacitive coupling by introducing an equal and opposite feedback path, later known as neutralization. Hazeltine filed patents on this technique beginning in 1919, describing it as a general method for suppressing capacity coupling between circuits. He described its application to tuned radio-frequency amplification and complete receiver circuits in a 1923 paper. Neutralization was later described in standard engineering texts as a method for stabilizing triode RF amplifiers in tuned radio-frequency receivers.

The neutrodyne receiver was developed partly to avoid the regenerative receiver patents held by Edwin Howard Armstrong; see

.In 1922, Harold A. Wheeler, working in Hazeltine’s laboratory at Stevens Institute of Technology, developed practical adjustment methods that made neutralization usable in multi-stage receivers. These techniques formed the practical basis of the Neutrodyne receiver.

By the 1930s, advances in vacuum tube manufacturing had yielded the tetrode, which had reduced control grid to plate (Miller) capacitance. These advances made it possible to build TRF receivers that did not need neutralization, but also made Edwin Armstrong's superheterodyne design practical for domestic receivers. So the TRF circuit, including the Neutrodyne, became obsolete in radio receivers and was superseded by the superheterodyne design.

The Neutrodyne neutralization technique continues to be used in other applications to suppress parasitic oscillation, such as in RF power amplifiers in radio transmitters.

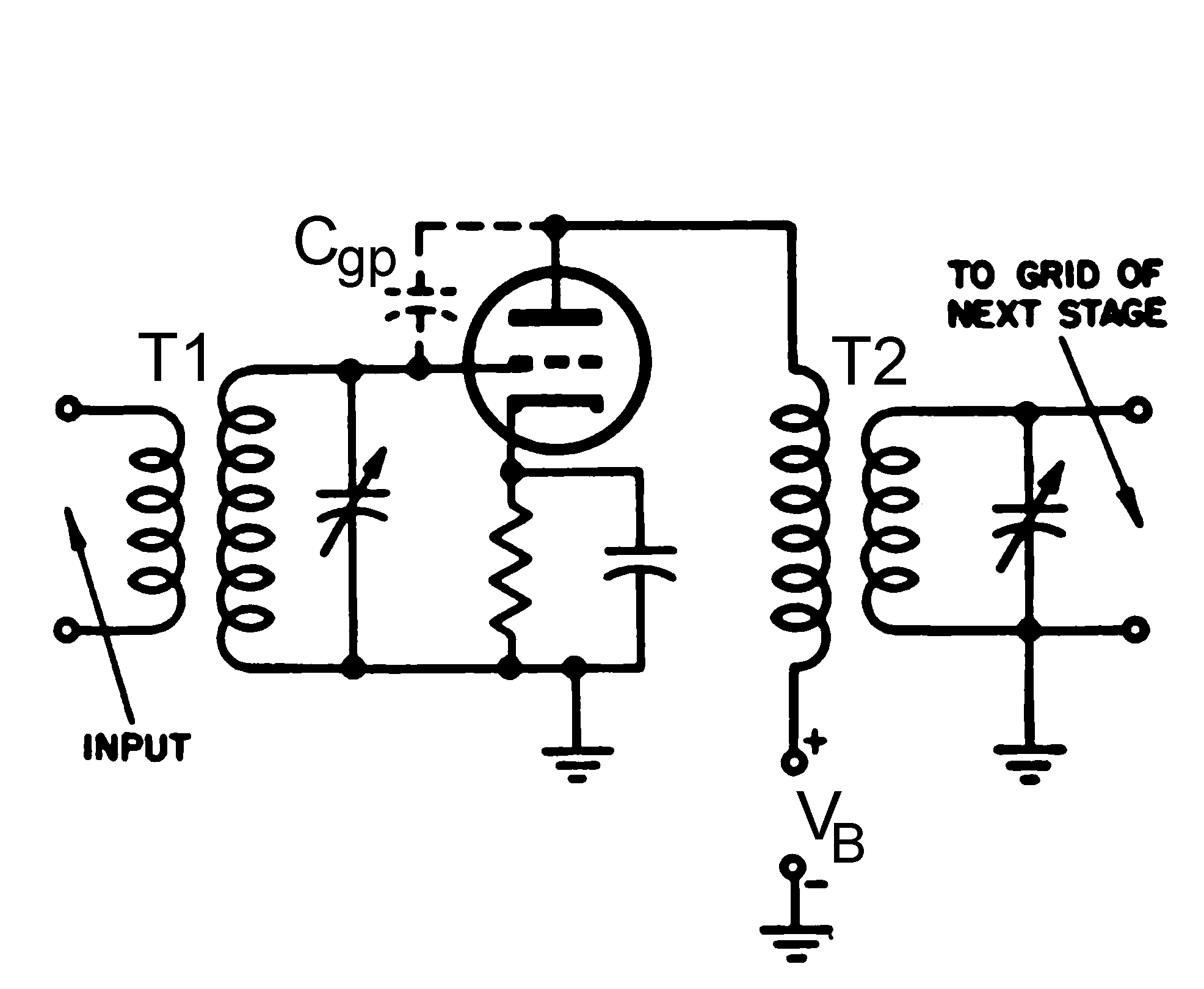
Tuned RF amplifier stage used in TRF receivers. C_{gp}, the internal grid-to-plate capacitance of the tube, provides a feedback path from the output to the input. Depending on frequency and circuit conditions, this feedback can become regenerative and cause the stage to oscillate.

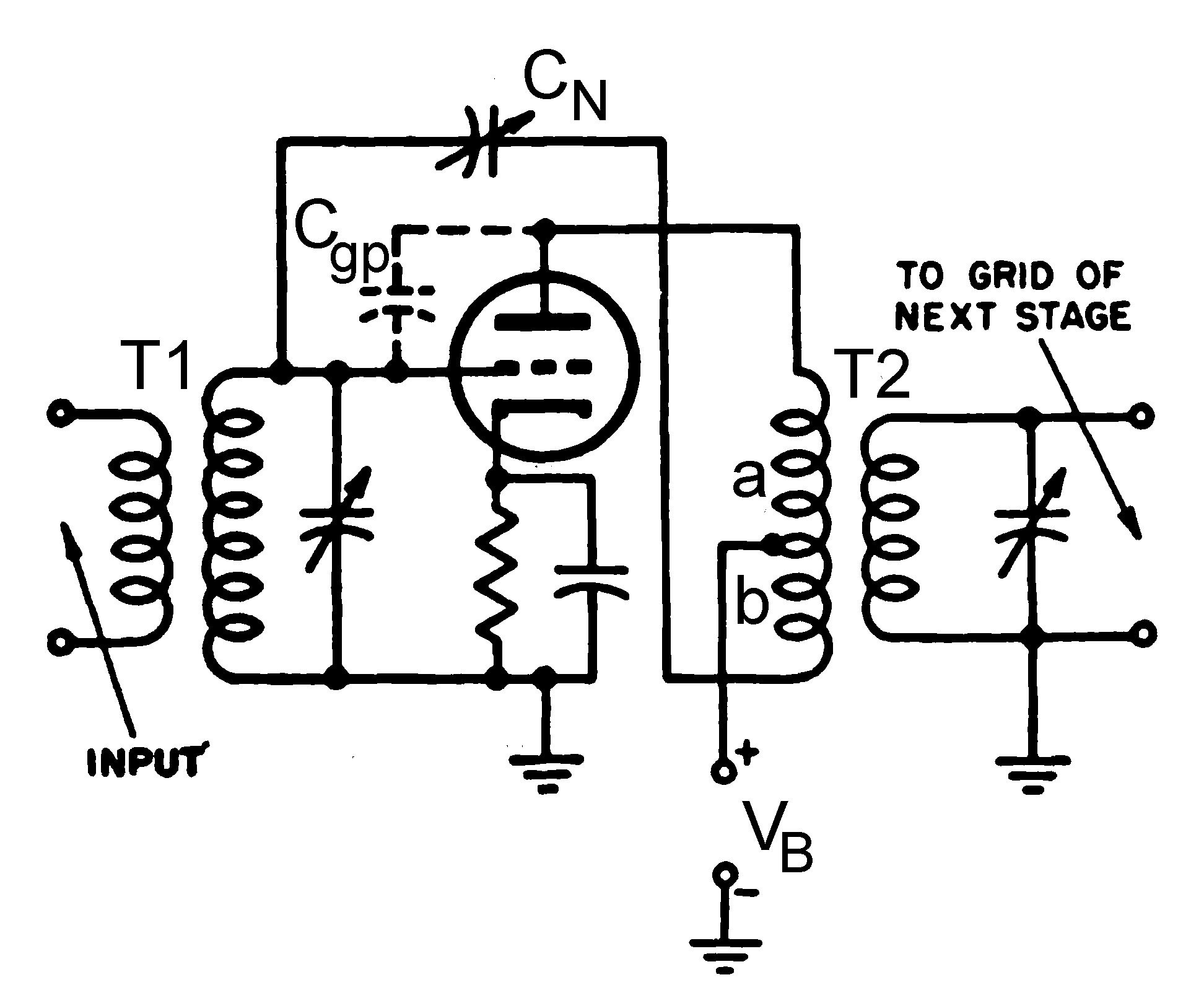
Original Neutrodyne circuit. C_{N} applies a second feedback signal to the grid which is 180° out of phase with the first, canceling ("neutralizing") it, to prevent oscillations. The signal is taken from an opposite phase winding (b) on the interstage coupling transformer T2.

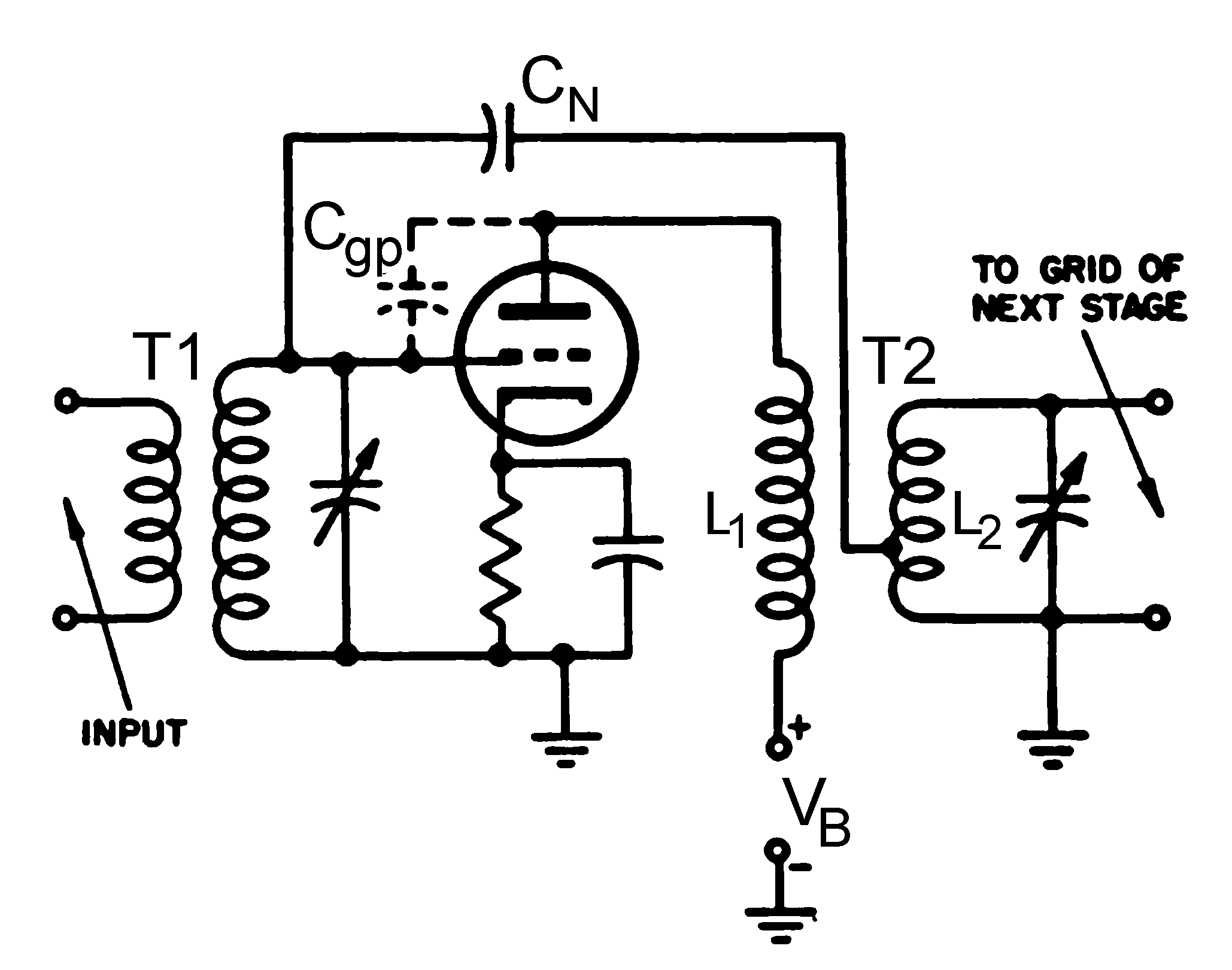
Modified Neutrodyne circuit in which the feedback is taken from the secondary of T2 instead of the primary.

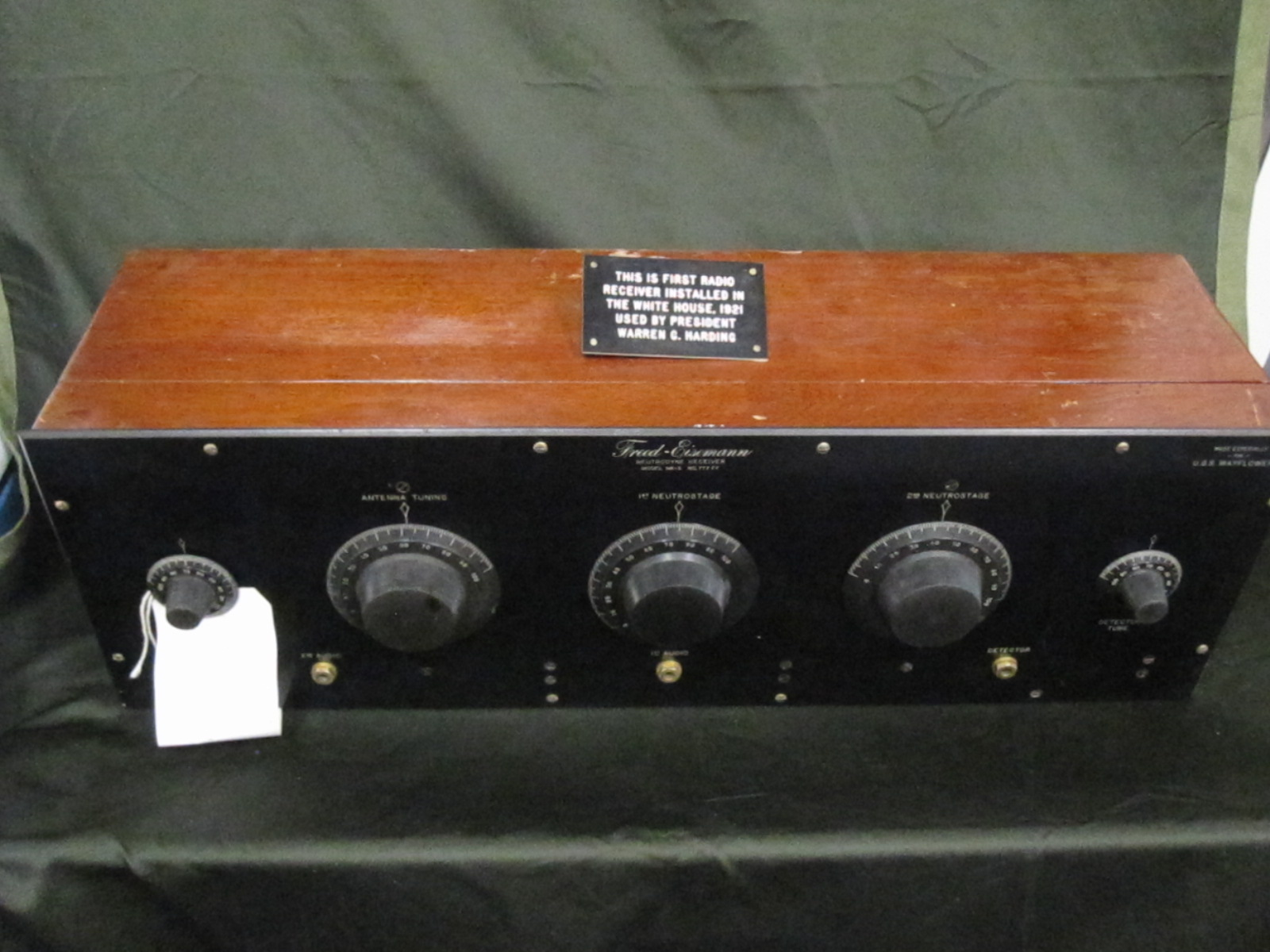
Neutrodyne receiver used on US President Warren Harding's yacht, the Mayflower

== Commercial adoption ==
Neutrodyne receivers entered commercial production in the early 1920s. Beginning in 1923, Hazeltine’s neutralization patents were licensed to a group of independent manufacturers, including members of the Independent Radio Manufacturers Association (IRMA). Contemporary sources report that between twelve and fourteen manufacturers were producing licensed Neutrodyne receivers by the mid-1920s. These licenses allowed companies outside RCA to produce competitive receivers at a time when key regenerative and superheterodyne patents were controlled by RCA.

== See also ==
- Crystal radio receiver
- Low IF receiver
- Regenerative radio receiver
- Superheterodyne receiver
- Tuned radio frequency receiver
