= Institute of Radio Engineers =

Professional organisation devoted to electrical engineering

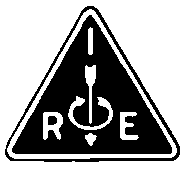
- Founded: 1912
- Defunct: 1963

The Institute of Radio Engineers (IRE) was a professional organization which existed from 1912 until December 31, 1962. On January 1, 1963, it merged with the American Institute of Electrical Engineers (AIEE) to form the Institute of Electrical and Electronics Engineers (IEEE).

== Founding ==
Following several attempts to form a technical organization of Wireless practitioners in 1908–1912, the Institute of Radio Engineers (IRE) was finally established in 1912 in New York City. Among its founding organizations were the Society of Wireless Telegraph Engineers (SWTE) and the Wireless Institute (TWI). At the time, the dominant organization of electrical engineers was the American Institute of Electrical Engineers (AIEE). Many of the founding members of IRE considered AIEE too conservative and too focused on electric power. Moreover, the founders of the IRE sought to establish an international organization (unlike the “American” AIEE), and adopted a tradition of electing some of the IRE's officers from outside the United States.

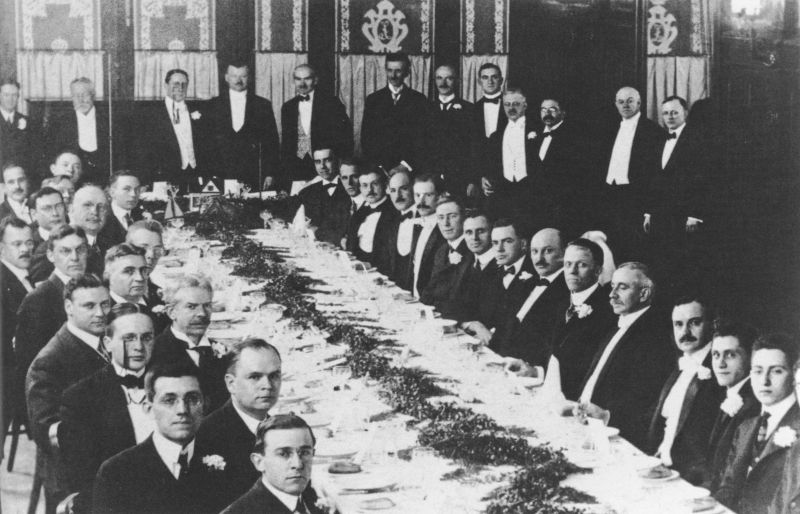
Second banquet meeting of the Institute of Radio Engineers, 1915. Nikola Tesla is standing at back, seventh from the right.

In the first half of the 20th century, radio communications had experienced great expansion, and the growing professional community of developers and operators of radio systems required standardization, research, and authoritative dissemination of new results among practitioners and researchers. To meet these needs, the IRE established professional journals (most notably the Proceedings of the IRE, established 1913 and edited for 41 years by Alfred N. Goldsmith); participated actively in all aspects of standardization and regulations of the frequency spectrum, modulation techniques, testing methods, and radio equipment; and organized regional and professional groups (starting in 1914 and 1948, respectively) for cooperation and exchange between members. The IRE was a major participant in planning of the Federal Radio Commission (established 1927; later the Federal Communications Commission), and worked in close cooperation with the National Electrical Manufacturers Association, the Radio Manufacturers Association, the Radio and Television Manufacturers Association, and the National Television System Committee on Standards. The IRE also started (in 1914) a program of professional recognition, through the membership grade of IRE Fellow. The first Fellow was Jonathan Zenneck (1871–1959), a pioneer of wireless telegraphy.

== Merger ==
Until the early 1940s IRE was a relatively small engineering organization, but the growing importance of electronic communications and the emergence of the discipline of electronics in the 1940s have increased its appeal to practitioners. Students of electrical engineering and young electrical engineers favored IRE over its older rival, the AIEE, and in 1957 IRE (with 57,000 members) was the larger organization. Negotiations about merging the two organizations started that year and continued until a new joint organization, the Institute of Electrical and Electronics Engineers (IEEE) was established in 1963. Several new professional organizations (such as the Society of Broadcast Engineers), were founded shortly thereafter by IRE and AIEE members who opposed the merger.

The first president of IRE was Robert H. Marriott, chief engineer of the Wireless Company of America. Other notable presidents of the IRE included Irving Langmuir (1923), John H. Morecroft (1924), Lee deForest (1930), Louis A. Hazeltine (1936), Frederick E. Terman (1941), Arthur F. Van Dyck (1942), William R. Hewlett (1954), Ernst Weber (1959; also first president of IEEE, 1963) and Patrick E. Haggerty (1962).

== Medal of Honor ==
The IRE issued the IRE Medal of Honor each year which is now the IEEE Medal of Honor.

== See also ==
- IRE Professional Group on Engineering Management
