= Handover =

Telecommunications process

In cellular telecommunications, handover, or handoff, is the process of transferring an ongoing call or data session from one channel connected to the core network to another channel. In satellite communications it is the process of transferring satellite control responsibility from one earth station to another without loss or interruption of service.

== Terminology ==
American English uses the term handoff, and this is most commonly used within some American organizations such as 3GPP2 and in American originated technologies such as CDMA2000. In British English the term handover is more common, and is used within international and European organisations such as ITU-T, IETF, ETSI and 3GPP, and standardised within European originated standards such as GSM and UMTS. The term handover is more common in academic research publications and literature, while handoff is slightly more common within the IEEE and ANSI organisations.

== Purpose ==
In telecommunications there may be different reasons why a handover might be conducted:

- when the phone is moving away from the area covered by one cell and entering the area covered by another cell the call is transferred to the second cell in order to avoid call termination when the phone gets outside the range of the first cell;
- when the capacity for connecting new calls of a given cell is used up and an existing or new call from a phone, which is located in an area overlapped by another cell, is transferred to that cell in order to free-up some capacity in the first cell for other users, who can only be connected to that cell;
- in non-CDMA networks when the channel used by the phone becomes interfered by another phone using the same channel in a different cell, the call is transferred to a different channel in the same cell or to a different channel in another cell in order to avoid the interference;
- again in non-CDMA networks when the user behaviour changes, e.g. when a fast-travelling user, connected to a large, umbrella-type of cell, stops then the call may be transferred to a smaller macro cell or even to a micro cell in order to free capacity on the umbrella cell for other fast-traveling users and to reduce the potential interference to other cells or users (this works in reverse too, when a user is detected to be moving faster than a certain threshold, the call can be transferred to a larger umbrella-type of cell in order to minimize the frequency of the handovers due to this movement);
- in CDMA networks a handover (see further down) may be induced in order to reduce the interference to a smaller neighboring cell due to the "near–far" effect even when the phone still has an excellent connection to its current cell.

The most basic form of handover is when a phone call in progress is redirected from its current cell (called source) to a new cell (called target). In terrestrial networks the source and the target cells may be served from two different cell sites or from one and the same cell site (in the latter case the two cells are usually referred to as two sectors on that cell site). Such a handover, in which the source and the target are different cells (even if they are on the same cell site) is called inter-cell handover. The purpose of inter-cell handover is to maintain the call as the subscriber is moving out of the area covered by the source cell and entering the area of the target cell.

A special case is possible, in which the source and the target are one and the same cell and only the used channel is changed during the handover. Such a handover, in which the cell is not changed, is called intra-cell handover. The purpose of intra-cell handover is to change one channel, which may be interfered or fading with a new clearer or less fading channel.

== Types ==
In addition to the above classification of inter-cell and intra-cell classification of handovers, they also can be divided into hard and soft handovers:

Hard handover
Is one in which the channel in the source cell is released and only then the channel in the target cell is engaged. Thus the connection to the source is broken before or 'as' the connection to the target is made—for this reason such handovers are also known as break-before-make. Hard handovers are intended to be instantaneous in order to minimize the disruption to the call. A hard handover is perceived by network engineers as an event during the call. It requires the least processing by the network providing service. When the mobile is between base stations, then the mobile can switch with any of the base stations, so the base stations bounce the link with the mobile back and forth. This is called 'ping-ponging'.
Soft handover
Is one in which the channel in the source cell is retained and used for a while in parallel with the channel in the target cell. In this case the connection to the target is established before the connection to the source is broken, hence this handover is called make-before-break. The interval, during which the two connections are used in parallel, may be brief or substantial. For this reason the soft handover is perceived by network engineers as a state of the call, rather than a brief event. Soft handovers may involve using connections to more than two cells: connections to three, four or more cells can be maintained by one phone at the same time. When a call is in a state of soft handover, the signal of the best of all used channels can be used for the call at a given moment or all the signals can be combined to produce a clearer copy of the signal. The latter is more advantageous, and when such combining is performed both in the downlink (forward link) and the uplink (reverse link) the handover is termed as softer. Softer handovers are possible when the cells involved in the handovers have a single cell site.

Handover can also be classified on the basis of handover techniques used. Broadly they can be classified into three types:

1. Network controlled handover
2. Mobile phone assisted handover
3. Mobile controlled handover

== Comparison ==
An advantage of the hard handover is that at any moment in time one call uses only one channel. The hard handover event is indeed very short and usually is not perceptible by the user. In the old analog systems it could be heard as a click or a very short beep; in digital systems it is unnoticeable. Another advantage of the hard handover is that the phone's hardware does not need to be capable of receiving two or more channels in parallel, which makes it cheaper and simpler. A disadvantage is that if a handover fails the call may be temporarily disrupted or even terminated abnormally. Technologies which use hard handovers, usually have procedures which can re-establish the connection to the source cell if the connection to the target cell cannot be made. However re-establishing this connection may not always be possible (in which case the call will be terminated) and even when possible the procedure may cause a temporary interruption to the call.

One advantage of the soft handovers is that the connection to the source cell is broken only when a reliable connection to the target cell has been established and therefore the chances that the call will be terminated abnormally due to failed handovers are lower. However, by far a bigger advantage comes from the mere fact that simultaneously channels in multiple cells are maintained and the call could only fail if all of the channels are interfered or fade at the same time. Fading and interference in different channels are unrelated and therefore the probability of them taking place at the same moment in all channels is very low. Thus the reliability of the connection becomes higher when the call is in a soft handover. Because in a cellular network the majority of the handovers occur in places of poor coverage, where calls would frequently become unreliable when their channel is interfered or fading, soft handovers bring a significant improvement to the reliability of the calls in these places by making the interference or the fading in a single channel not critical. This advantage comes at the cost of more complex hardware in the phone, which must be capable of processing several channels in parallel. Another price to pay for soft handovers is use of several channels in the network to support just a single call. This reduces the number of remaining free channels and thus reduces the capacity of the network. By adjusting the duration of soft handovers and the size of the areas in which they occur, the network engineers can balance the benefit of extra call reliability against the price of reduced capacity.

== Possibility ==
While theoretically speaking soft handovers are possible in any technology, analog or digital, the cost of implementing them for analog technologies is prohibitively high and none of the technologies that were commercially successful in the past (e.g. AMPS, TACS, NMT, etc.) had this feature. Of the digital technologies, those based on FDMA also face a higher cost for the phones (due to the need to have multiple parallel radio-frequency modules) and those based on TDMA or a combination of TDMA/FDMA, in principle, allow not so expensive implementation of soft handovers. However, none of the 2G (second-generation) technologies have this feature (e.g. GSM, D-AMPS/IS-136, etc.). On the other hand, all CDMA based technologies, 2G and 3G (third-generation), have soft handovers. On one hand, this is facilitated by the possibility to design not so expensive phone hardware supporting soft handovers for CDMA and on the other hand, this is necessitated by the fact that without soft handovers CDMA networks may suffer from substantial interference arising due to the so-called near–far effect.

In all current commercial technologies based on FDMA or on a combination of TDMA/FDMA (e.g. GSM, AMPS, IS-136/DAMPS, etc.) changing the channel during a hard handover is realised by changing the pair of used transmit/receive frequencies.

== Implementations ==
For the practical realisation of handovers in a cellular network each cell is assigned a list of potential target cells, which can be used for handing over calls from this source cell to them. These potential target cells are called neighbors and the list is called neighbor list. Creating such a list for a given cell is not trivial and specialized computer tools are used. They implement different algorithms and may use for input data from field measurements or computer predictions of radio wave propagation in the areas covered by the cells.

During a call one or more parameters of the signal in the channel in the source cell are monitored and assessed in order to decide when a handover may be necessary. The downlink (forward link) and/or uplink (reverse link) directions may be monitored. The handover may be requested by the phone or by the base station (BTS) of its source cell and, in some systems, by a BTS of a neighboring cell. The phone and the BTSes of the neighboring cells monitor each other's signals and the best target candidates are selected among the neighboring cells. In some systems, mainly based on CDMA, a target candidate may be selected among the cells which are not in the neighbor list. This is done in an effort to reduce the probability of interference due to the aforementioned near–far effect.

In analog systems the parameters used as criteria for requesting a hard handover are usually the received signal power and the received signal-to-noise ratio (the latter may be estimated in an analog system by inserting additional tones, with frequencies just outside the captured voice-frequency band at the transmitter and assessing the form of these tones at the receiver). In non-CDMA 2G digital systems the criteria for requesting hard handover may be based on estimates of the received signal power, bit error rate (BER) and block error/erasure rate (BLER), received quality of speech (RxQual), distance between the phone and the BTS (estimated from the radio signal propagation delay) and others. In CDMA systems, 2G and 3G, the most common criterion for requesting a handover is Ec/Io ratio measured in the pilot channel (CPICH) and/or RSCP.

In CDMA systems, when the phone in soft or softer handover is connected to several cells simultaneously, it processes the received in parallel signals using a rake receiver. Each signal is processed by a module called rake finger. A usual design of a rake receiver in mobile phones includes three or more rake fingers used in soft handover state for processing signals from as many cells and one additional finger used to search for signals from other cells. The set of cells, whose signals are used during a soft handover, is referred to as the active set. If the search finger finds a sufficiently-strong signal (in terms of high Ec/Io or RSCP) from a new cell this cell is added to the active set. The cells in the neighbour list (called in CDMA neighbouring set) are checked more frequently than the rest and thus a handover with a neighbouring cell is more likely, however a handover with others cells outside the neighbor list is also allowed (unlike in GSM, IS-136/DAMPS, AMPS, NMT, etc.).

== Reasons for failure ==
There are occurrences where a handoff is unsuccessful. Much research has been dedicated to this problem. The source of the problem was discovered in the late 1980s. Because frequencies cannot be reused in adjacent cells, when a user moves from one cell to another, a new frequency must be allocated for the call. If a user moves into a cell when all available channels are in use, the user's call must be terminated. Also, there is the problem of signal interference where adjacent cells overpower each other resulting in receiver desensitization.

== Vertical handover ==
There are also inter-technology handovers where a call's connection is transferred from one access technology to another, e.g. a call being transferred from GSM to UMTS or from CDMA IS-95 to CDMA2000.

The 3GPP UMA/GAN standard enables GSM/UMTS handoff to Wi-Fi and vice versa.

== Handoff Prioritization ==
Different systems have different methods for handling and managing handoff request. Some systems handle handoff in same way as they handle new originating call. In such system the probability that the handoff will not be served is equal to blocking probability of new originating call. But if the call is terminated abruptly in the middle of conversation then it is more annoying than the new originating call being blocked. So in order to avoid this abrupt termination of ongoing call handoff request should be given priority to new call this is called as handoff prioritization.

There are two techniques for this:

Guard Channel Concept
In this technique, a fraction of the total available channels in a cell is reserved exclusively for handoff request from ongoing calls which may be handed off into the cell.
Queuing
Queuing of handoffs is possible because there is a finite time interval between the time the received signal level drops below handoff threshold and the time the call is terminated due to insufficient signal level. The delay size is determined from the traffic pattern of a particular service area.

== Inter and Intra System Handoff ==
Inter System Handoff

- If during ongoing call mobile unit moves from one cellular system to a different cellular system which is controlled by different MTSO, a handoff procedure which is used to avoid dropping of call is referred as Inter System Handoff.
- An MTSO engages in this handoff system. When a mobile signal becomes weak in a given cell and MTSO can not find other cell within its system to which it can transfer the call then it uses Inter system handoff.
- Before implementation of Inter System Handoff MTSO compatibility must be checked and in Inter System Handoff local call may become long-distance call.

Intra System Handoff

- If during ongoing call mobile unit moves from one cellular system to adjacent cellular system which is controlled by same MTSO, a handoff procedure which is used to avoid dropping of call is referred as Intra System Handoff.
- An MTSO engages in this handoff system. When a mobile signal becomes weak in a given cell and MTSO finds other cell within its system to which it can transfer the call then it uses Intra system handoff.
- In Intra System Handoff local calls always remain local call only since after handoff also the call is handled by same MTSO.

== See also ==
- Cellular network
- Roaming
- Mobility management
- Radio resource management
- UMA/GAN
- Voice call continuity
- Change-of-shift report, handing over work duties to the next shift in the health care and nursing
- Follow-the-sun, handing over work duties to the next shift in software development
