= Timeline of electrical and electronics engineering =

The following timeline tables list the discoveries and inventions in the history of electrical and electronics engineering.

== History of discoveries timeline ==
Year	Event
600 BCE	Ancient Greek philosopher Thales of Miletus described static electricity by rubbing fur on substances such as amber.
1600	English scientist William Gilbert coined the word electricus after careful experiments. He also explained the magnetism of Earth.
1660	German scientist Otto von Guericke invented a device that creates static electricity. This is the first ever electric generator.
1705	English scientist Francis Hauksbee made a glass ball that glowed when spun and rubbed with the hand
1720	English scientist Stephen Gray made the distinction between insulators and conductors.
1745	German physicist Ewald Georg von Kleist and Dutch scientist Pieter van Musschenbroek invented Leyden jars.
1752	American scientist Benjamin Franklin showed that lightning was electrical by flying a kite and explained how Leyden jars work.
1780	Italian scientist Luigi Galvani discovered Galvanic action in living tissue.
1785	French physicist Charles-Augustin de Coulomb formulated and published Coulomb's law in his paper Premier Mémoire sur l’Électricité et le Magnétisme.
1785	French mathematician Pierre-Simon Laplace developed the Laplace transform to transform a linear differential equation into an algebraic equation. Later, his transform became a tool in circuit analysis.
1800	Italian physicist Alessandro Volta invented the battery.
1804	Thomas Young: Wave theory of light, Vision and color theory
1808	Atomic theory by John Dalton
1816	English inventor Francis Ronalds built the first working electric telegraph.
1820	Danish physicist Hans Christian Ørsted accidentally discovered that an electric field creates a magnetic field.
1820	One week after Ørsted's discovery, French physicist André-Marie Ampère published his law. He also proposed the right-hand screw rule.
1821	German scientist Thomas Johann Seebeck discovered thermoelectricity.
1825	English physicist William Sturgeon developed the first electromagnet.
1827	German physicist Georg Ohm introduced the concept of electrical resistance.
1831	English physicist Michael Faraday published the law of induction (Joseph Henry developed the same law independently).
1831	American scientist Joseph Henry in the United States developed a prototype DC motor.
1832	French instrument maker Hippolyte Pixii in France developed a prototype DC generator.
1833	Michael Faraday developed the laws of electrolysis.
1833	Michael Faraday invented the thermistor
1833	English physicist Samuel Hunter Christie invented the Wheatstone bridge (It is named after Charles Wheatstone who popularized it).
1836	Irish priest (and later scientist) Nicholas Callan invented the transformer in Ireland.
1837	English scientist Edward Davy invented the electric relay.
1839	French scientist Edmond Becquerel discovered the photovoltaic effect.
1844	American inventor Samuel Morse developed telegraphy and the Morse code.
1844	Woolrich Generator, the earliest electrical generator used in an industrial process.
1845	German physicist Gustav Kirchhoff developed the two laws now known as Kirchhoff's Circuit laws.
1850	Belgian engineer Floris Nollet invented (and patented) a practical AC generator.
1851	Heinrich Daniel Ruhmkorff developed the first coil, which he patented in 1851
1855	First utilization of AC (in electrotherapy) by French neurologist Guillaume Duchenne.
1856	Belgian engineer Charles Bourseul proposed telephony.
1856	First electrically powered lighthouse in England
1860	German scientist Johann Philipp Reis invented the microphone.
1862	Scottish physicist James Clerk Maxwell published the four equations bearing his name.
1866	The Transatlantic telegraph cable
1873	Belgian engineer Zenobe Gramme who developed the DC generator accidentally discovered that a DC generator also works as a DC motor during an exhibit in Vienna.
1876	Paper capacitor manufacturing started.
1876	Russian engineer Pavel Yablochkov invented the electric carbon arc lamp.
1876	Scottish inventor Alexander Graham Bell patented the telephone.
1877	American inventor Thomas Edison invented the phonograph.
1877	German industrialist Werner von Siemens developed a primitive loudspeaker.
1878	First electric street lighting in Paris, France
1878	First hydroelectric plant in Cragside, England
1878	William Crookes invents the Crookes tube, a prototype of Vacuum tubes
1878	English engineer Joseph Swan invented the Incandescent light bulb.
1879	American physicist Edwin Herbert Hall discovered the Hall Effect.
1879	Thomas Edison introduced a long-lasting filament for the incandescent lamp.
1880	French physicists Pierre Curie and Jacques Curie discovered Piezoelectricity.
1882	First thermal power stations in London and New York
1887	German American inventor Emile Berliner invented the gramophone record.
1888	German physicist Heinrich Hertz proves the existence of electromagnetic waves, including what would come to be called radio waves
1888	Italian physicist and electrical engineer Galileo Ferraris publishes a paper on the induction motor, and Serbian-American engineer Nikola Tesla gets a US patent on the same device
1890	Thomas Edison invents the fuse
1893	During the Fourth International Conference of Electricians in Chicago, electrical units were defined
1893	English physicist J. J. Thomson invented waveguides.
1894	Italian inventor Guglielmo Marconi begins developing the first radio wave based wireless telegraphy communication system
1895	Indian physicist Jagadish Chandra Bose conducts experiments in extremely high frequency millimetre waves using a semiconductor junction to detect radio waves
1895	In a series of field experiments, Marconi finds that he could transmit radio waves at much greater range than the half-mile maximum physicist of the time were predicting, achieving ranges up to 2 miles (3.2 km) and transmitting over hills
1895	Russian physicist Alexander Popov finds a use for radio waves, building a radio receiver that can detect lightning strikes
1895	Discovery of X-rays by Wilhelm Röntgen
1896	Electrolytic capacitor patent was granted to Charles Pollak.
1897	German inventor Karl Ferdinand Braun invented cathode ray oscilloscope (CRO).
1901	First transatlantic radio transmission by Guglielmo Marconi
1901	American engineer Peter Cooper Hewitt invented the Fluorescent lamp.
1904	English engineer John Ambrose Fleming invented the diode.
1906	American inventor Lee de Forest invented the triode.
1908	Scottish engineer Alan Archibald Campbell-Swinton, laid out the principles of television.
1909	Mica capacitor was invented by William Dubilier.
1911	Dutch physicist Heike Kamerlingh Onnes discovered Superconductivity.
1912	American engineer Edwin Howard Armstrong developed the electronic oscillator.
1915	French physicist Paul Langevin and Russian engineer Constantin Chilowsky invented sonar.
1917	American engineer Alexander M. Nicholson invented the crystal oscillator.
1918	French physicist Henri Abraham and Eugene Bloch invented the multivibrator.
1919	Edwin Howard Armstrong developed the standard AM radio receiver.
1921	Metre Convention was extended to include the electrical units.
1921	Edith Clarke invents the "Clarke calculator", a graphical calculator for solving line equations involving hyperbolic function, allowing electrical engineers to simplify calculations for inductance and capacity in power transmission lines
1924	Japanese engineer Kenjiro Takayanagi began a research program on electronic television.
1925	Austrian American engineer Julius Edgar Lilienfeld patented the first FET (which became popular much later).
1926	Yagi–Uda antenna was developed by the Japanese engineers Hidetsugu Yagi and Shintaro Uda.
1926	Japanese engineer Kenjiro Takayanagi demonstrated CRT television with 40-line resolution, the first working example of a fully electronic television receiver.
1927	Japanese engineer Kenjiro Takayanagi increased television resolution to 100 lines, unrivaled until 1931.
1927	American engineer Harold Stephen Black invented negative feedback amplifier.
1927	German Physicist Max Dieckmann invented video camera tube.
1928	Raman scattering discovered by Indian physicist C. V. Raman and Indian physicist Kariamanickam Srinivasa Krishnan, providing basis for later Raman laser
1928	Japanese engineer Kenjiro Takayanagi was the first to transmit human faces in half-tones on television, influencing the later work of Vladimir K. Zworykin
1928	First experimental Television broadcast in the U.S.
1929	First public TV broadcast in Germany
1931	First wind energy plant in the Soviet Union
1934	Akira Nakashima, Claude Shannon and Viktor Shetakov switching circuit theory lays the foundation for digital electronics
1936	Dudley E. Foster and Stuart William Seeley developed the FM detector circuit.
1936	Austrian engineer Paul Eisler invented the printed circuit board.
1936	Scottish Scientist Robert Watson-Watt developed the radar concept which was proposed earlier.
1938	Russian-American engineer Vladimir K. Zworykin developed the iconoscope.
1939	Edwin Howard Armstrong developed the FM radio receiver.
1939	Russell and Sigurd Varian developed the first Klystron tube in the US.
1941	German engineer Konrad Zuse developed the first programmable computer in Berlin.
1944	Scottish Engineer John Logie Baird developed the first color picture tube.
1945	Transatlantic telephone cable
1948	First transistor: Bipolar junction transistor (BJT) by american engineers John Bardeen and Walter Houser Brattain together with their group leader William Shockley
1948	Hungarian-British physicist Dennis Gabor invented holography.
1950s	Solid electrolyte tantalum capacitor was invented by Bell Laboratories.
1950	French physicist Alfred Kastler invented the MASER.
1951	First nuclear power plant in the US
1952	Japanese engineer Jun-ichi Nishizawa invented the avalanche photodiode
1953	First fully transistorized computer by Bell Labs (U.S.): TRADIC
1959	First working discrete MOSFET: p-MOSFET by Bell Labs
1958	American engineer Jack Kilby invented the integrated circuit (IC).
1960	American engineer Theodore Maiman develops the first laser
1962	Nick Holonyak invented the LED.
1963	First home Videocassette recorder (VCR)
1963	Electronic calculator
1966	Fiber-optic communication by Kao and Hockham
2008	American scientist R. Stanley Williams invented the memristor which was proposed by Leon O. Chua in 1971.

== History of associated inventions timeline ==
Brief History of Electronics Timeline
Date	Invention/Discovery	Inventor(s)
1900	Old quantum theory	Planck
1905	Theory of relativity	Einstein
1918	Atomic transmutation	Rutherford
1932	Neutron	Chadwick
1932	Particle accelerator	Cockcroft and Walton
1935	Scanning electron microscope	Knoll
1937	Xerography	Carlson
1937	Oscilloscope	Von Ardenne, Dowling, and Bullen
1950	Modem	MIT and Bell Labs
1950	Karnaugh mapping technique (digital logic)	Karnaugh
1952	Digital voltmeter	Kay
1954	Solar battery	Chapin, Fuller, and Pearson
1956	Transatlantic telephone cable	UK and U.S.
1957	Sputnik I satellite	Soviet Union
1957	Nuclear Missile	Kurchatov / Soviet Union
1957	FORTRAN programming language	Watson Scientific
1959	First one-piece plain paper photocopier (Xerox 914)	Xerox
1959	Veroboard (Stripboard)	Terry Fitzpatrick
1961	Electronic clock	Vogel and Cie, patented by Alexander Bain, a Scottish clockmaker in 1840.
1963	First commercially successful audio compact cassette	Philips Corporation
1964	BASIC programming language	Kemeny and Kurtz
1964	Liquid-crystal display	George H. Heilmeier
late 1960s	First digital fax machine	Dacom
1969	UNIX operating system	AT&T's Bell Labs
1970	First microprocessor (4004, 60,000 oper/s)	Intel
1970	First commercially available DRAM memory	IBM
1971	EPROM	N/A
1971	PASCAL programming language	Niklaus Wirth
1971	First microcomputer-on-a-chip	Intel
1971	Laser printer	Xerox
1972	8008 processor (200 kHz, 16 kB)	Intel
1972	First programmable word processor	Automatic Electronic Systems
1972	5¼-inch diskette	N/A
1972	First modern ATM (IBM 2984)	IBM
1973	Josephson junction	IBM
1973	Tunable continuous-wave laser	Bell Labs
1973	Ethernet	Robert Metcalfe at Xerox PARC
1973	Mobile phone	John F. Mitchell and Dr. Martin Cooper of Motorola
1974	C (programming language)	Kernighan, Ritchie
1974	Programmable pocket calculator	Hewlett-Packard
1975	BASIC for personal computers	Allen
1975	First personal computer (Altair 8800)	Roberts
1975	Digital camera	Steven Sasson of Eastman Kodak
1975	Integrated optical circuits	Reinhart and Logan
1975	Omni-font optical character recognition system	Nuance Communications
1975	CCD flatbed scanner	Kurzweil Computer Products
1975	Text-to-speech synthesis	Kurzweil Computer Products
1975	First commercial reading machine for the blind (Kurzweil Reading Machine)	Kurzweil Computer Products
1976	Apple I computer	Wozniak, Jobs
1977	Launch of the "1977 trinity computers" expanding home computing, the Apple II, Commodore PET and the TRS-80	Apple, Tandy Corporation, Commodore Business Machines
1977	First handheld electronic game (Auto Race)	Mattel
1977	LZ77 LZ77 algorithm created	Abraham Lempel and Jacob Ziv
1978	WordPerfect 1.0	Satellite Software
1980	3½-inch floppy (2-sided, 875 kB)	N/A
1980	VIC-20	Commodore Business Machines
1981	IBM Personal Computer (8088 processor)	IBM
1981	MS-DOS 1.0	Microsoft
1981	"Wet" solar cell	Bayer AG
1982	Commodore 64	Commodore Business Machines
1982	First commercially marketed large-vocabulary speech recognition	Kurzweil Applied Intelligence and Dragon Systems
1983	Satellite television	U.S. Satellite Communications, Inc.
1983	First built-in hard drive (IBM PC XT)	IBM
1983	C++ (programming language)	Stroustrup
1984	Macintosh computer (introduced)	Apple Computer
1984	CD-ROM player for personal computers	Philips
1984	First music synthesizer (Kurzweil K250) capable of recreating the grand piano and other orchestral instruments	Kurzweil Music Systems
1984	Amiga computer (introduced)	Commodore
1985	300,000 simultaneous telephone conversations over single optical fiber	AT&T, Bell Labs
1987	Warmer superconductivity	Karl Alex Mueller
1987	80386 microprocessor (25 MHz)	Intel
1989	First commercial handheld GPS receiver (Magellan NAV 1000)	Magellan Navigation Inc.
1989	Silicon–germanium transistors	IBM fellow Bernie Meyerson
1990	486 microprocessor (33 MHz)	Intel
1993	HAARP	U.S.
1994	Pentium processor, P5-based (60/90 MHz, 166.2 MIPS)	Intel
1994	Bluetooth	Ericsson
1994	First DVD player ever made	Tatung Company
1996	Alpha 21164 processor (550 MHz)	Digital Equipment
1996	P2SC processor (15 million transistors)	IBM

== Innovations in consumer electronics ==
=== 1843–1923: From electromechanics to electronics ===
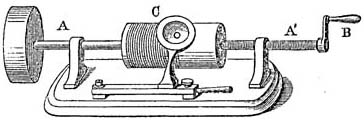
Thomas Edison's phonograph

- 1843: Watchmaker Alexander Bain develops the basic concept of displaying images as points with different brightness values.
- 1848: Frederick Collier Bakewell invents the first wirephoto machine, an early fax machine
- 1861: Grade school teacher Philipp Reis presents his telephone in Frankfurt, inventing the loudspeaker as a by-product.
- 1867: French poet and philosopher Charles Cros (1842–1888) presents the construction principle of a phonograph in his 'paréophone', which turned out not to be a commercial success at the time.
- 1867: James Clerk Maxwell (1831–1879) develops a theory predicting the existence of electromagnetic waves and establishes Maxwell's equations to describe their properties. Together with the Lorentz force law, these equations form the foundation for classical electrodynamics, optics, and electric circuits.
- 1874: Ferdinand Braun discovers the rectifier effect in metal sulfides and metal oxides.
- 1877: Thomas Edison (1847–1931) invents the first phonograph, using a tin foil cylinder. For the first time, sounds could be recorded and played. A phonograph horn with membrane and needle was arranged so that the needle had contact with the tin foil.
- 1880: the American physicist Charles Sumner Tainter discovers that many disadvantages of Edison's cylinders can be eliminated if the soundtrack is arranged in spiral form and engraved in a flat, round disk. Technical problems soon ended these experiments. Still, Tainter is regarded as the gramophone record inventor.
- 1884: Paul Nipkow obtains a patent for his Nipkow disk, an image-scanning device that reads images serially, which constitutes the foundation for mechanical television. Two years later, his patent ran out.
- 1886: Heinrich Hertz succeeds in proving the existence of electromagnetic waves for the first time – now the groundwork for wireless telegraphy and radio broadcasting in physical science is laid.
- 1887: Unaware of Charles Sumner Tainter's experiments, German-American Emil Berliner has his phonograph patented. He used a disk instead of a cylinder to avoid infringing on Edison's patent. Quickly it becomes obvious that flat Gramophone records are easier to duplicate and store.
- 1888:
  - Alexander Graham Bell (1847–1922) significantly reduces interfering noises by using a wax cylinder instead of tin foil. This paved the way for commercial success for the improved phonograph.
  - American Oberlin Smith describes a process to record audio using a cotton thread with integrated fine wire clippings. This makes reel-to-reel audio tape recording possible.
- 1890:
  - The phonograph becomes faster and more convenient due to an electric motor. The electric motor brings on the first juke box with cylinders – even before flat disk records were widely available.
  - Thomas Edison discovers thermionic emission. This effect forms the basis for the vacuum tube and the cathode ray tube.
- approximately 1893: The selenium phototube invention allows the conversion of brightness values into electrical signals. The principle is applied in wirephoto and television technology for a short time. Selenium is used in light meters for the next 50 years.

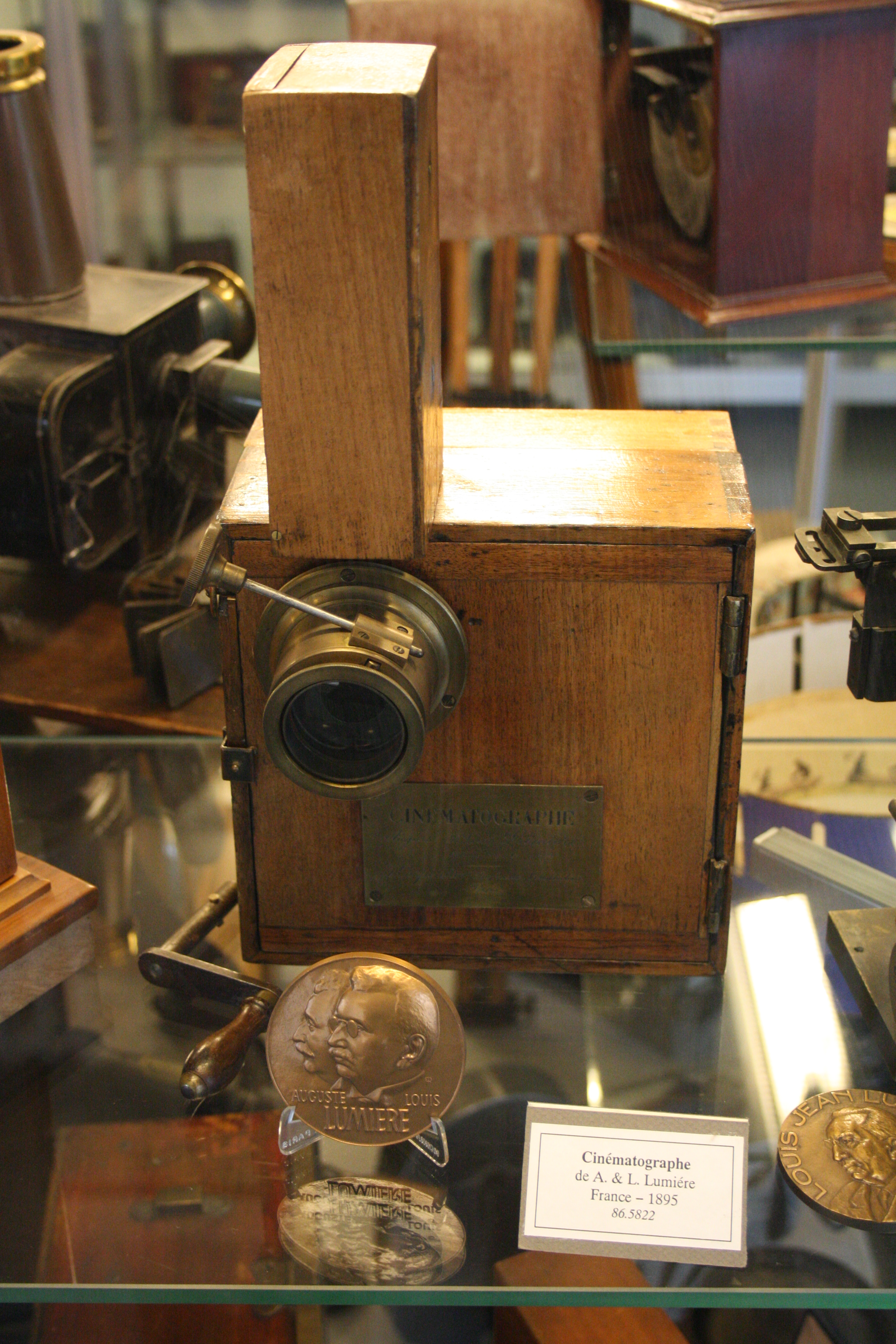
Cinématographe camera by the Lumière brothers in 1895 (ref 86.5822) at the French Museum of Photography in Bièvres, Essonne, France

- 1895: Auguste Lumiere's cinematograph displays moving images for the first time. In the same year, brothers Emil and Max Skladanowsky present their "Bioscop" in Berlin.
- 1897
  - Ferdinand Braun invents the "inertialess cathode ray oscillograph tube", a principle that remained unchanged in television picture tubes.
  - The Italian Guglielmo Marconi transmits wireless telegraph messages by electromagnetic waves over a distance of five kilometers.
- 1898
  - The Danish physicist Valdemar Poulsen creates the world's first magnetic recording and reproduction, using a 1 mm thick steel wire as a magnetizable carrier.
  - Nikola Tesla publicly demonstrated the first wireless remote control of a model ship.
- 1899: The dog "Nipper" is used in "His Master's Voice", the trademark for gramophones.
- 1901: The Spanish engineer Leonardo Torres Quevedo began the development of a radio control system, which he called Telekino, to test dirigible balloons of his creation without risking human lives. It was able to execute a finite but not limited set of different mechanical actions using a single communication channel, laying down modern wireless remote control operation principles.
- 1902
  - Otto von Bronk patented his "Method and apparatus for remote visualization of images and objects with a temporary resolution of the images in parallel rows of dots". This patent, initially developed for phototelegraphy, impacted the development of color television, particularly the NTSC implementation.
  - For the first time, audio records are printed with paper labels in the middle.
- 1903: Guglielmo Marconi provides evidence that wireless telegraphic communication is possible over long distances, such as across the Atlantic. He used a transmitter developed by Ferdinand Braun.
- 1904
  - For the first time, double-sided records and those with a diameter of 30 cm are produced, increasing playing time up to 11 minutes (5.5 minutes per side). These are created by Odeon in Berlin and debuted at the Leipzig Spring Fair.
  - The German physicist Arthur Korn developed the first practical method for telegraphy.
- 1905: The Englishman Sir John Ambrose Fleming invents the first electron tube.
- 1906
  - Robert von Lieben patented his "inertia working cathode-ray-relays". By 1910 he developed this into the first real tube amplifier, by creating a triode. His invention of the triode is almost simultaneously created by the American Lee de Forest.
  - Max Dieckmann and Gustav Glage use the Braun tube for playback of 20-line black-and-white images.
  - The first jukebox with records comes on the market.
  - American Brigadier General Henry Harrison Chase Dunwoody files for a patent for a carborundum steel detector for use in a crystal radio, an improved version of the Cat's-whisker detector. It is sometimes credited as the first semiconductor in history. The envelope detector is an important part of every radio receiver.
- 1907: Rosenthal puts in his image telegraph for the first time a photocell.
- 1911: First film studios are created in Hollywood and Potsdam- Babelsberg .
- 1912: The first radio receiver is created, in accordance with the Audion principle.
- 1913: The legal battle over the invention of the electron tube between Robert von Lieben and Lee de Forest is decided. The electron tube is replaced by a high vacuum in the glass flask with significantly improved properties.
  - Alexander Meissner patented his process "feedback for generating oscillations", by his development of a radio station using an electron tube .
  - The Englishman Arthur Berry submits a patent on the manufacture of printed circuits by etched metal.
- 1915: Carl Benedicks leads basic studies in Sweden on the electrical properties of silicon and germanium. Due to the emerging tube technology, however, interest in semiconductors remains low until after the Second World War.
- 1917
  - Based on previous findings of the Englishman Oliver Lodge, the Frenchman Lucien Levy develops a radio receiver with frequency tuning using a resonant circuit.
- 1919: Charlie Chaplin founds the Hollywood film production and distribution company United Artists
- 1920: The first regularly operating radio station KDKA goes on air on 2 November 1920 in Philadelphia, USA. It is the first time electronics are used to transmit information and entertainment to the public at large. The same year in Germany an instrumental concert was broadcast on the radio from a long-wave transmitter in Wusterhausen.
- 1922: J. McWilliams Stone invents the first portable radio receiver. George Frost builds the first "car radio" in his Ford Model T.
- 1923
  - The 15-year-old Manfred von Ardenne is granted his first patent for an electron tube having a plurality of electrodes. Siegmund Loewe (1885–1962) builds with the tube his first radio receiver "Loewe Opta-".
  - The Hungarian engineer Dénes Mihály patented an image scanning with line deflection, in which each point of an image is scanned ten times per second by a selenium cell.
  - August Karolus (1893–1972) invents the Kerr cell, an almost inertia-free conversion of electrical pulses into light signals. He was granted a patent for his method of transmitting slides.
  - Vladimir Kosma developed the first television camera tube, the Ikonoskop, using the Braun tube.
  - The German State Secretary Karl August Bredow founds the first German broadcasting organization. By lifting the ban on broadcast reception and the opening of the first private radio station, the development of radio as a mass medium begins.

=== 1924–1959: From cathode ray tube to stereo audio and TV ===
- 1924: the first radio receivers are exhibited at the Berlin Radio Show
- 1925
  - Brunswick Records in Dubuque, Iowa produced their first record player, the Brunswick Panatrope with a pickup, amplifier and loudspeaker
  - In the American Bell Laboratories, a method for recording of records obtained by microphone and tube amps for series production. Also in Germany working on it is ongoing since 1922. 1925 appear the first electrically recorded disks in both countries.
  - At the Leipzig Spring Fair, the first miniature camera "Leica" is presented to the public.
  - John Logie Baird performs the first screening of a living head with a resolution of 30 vertical lines using a Nipkow disk.
  - August Karolus demonstrated in Germany television with 48 lines and ten image changes per second.
- 1926
  - Edison developed the first "LP". By dense grooves (16 grooves on 1 mm) and the reduction of speed to 80 min −1 (later 78 min −1) increases the playing time up to 2 times 20 minutes. He carries himself with the decline of his phonograph business.
  - The German State Railroad offers a cordless telephone service in moving trains between Berlin and Hamburg – the idea of mobile telephony is born.
  - John Logie Baird developed the first commercial television set in the world. It was not until 1930, he is called a " telescreen sold "at a price of 20 pounds.
- 1927
  - The first fully electronic music boxes ("Jukeboxes") used in the USA on the market.
  - German Grammophon on sale due to a license agreement with the Brunswick-Balke-Collender Company. Its first fully electronic turntables.
  - The first industrially manufactured car radio, the "Philco Transitone" from the "Storage Battery Co." in Philadelphia, USA, comes on the market.
  - The first shortwave radio – Rundfunkübertragung overseas broadcast by the station PCJJ the Philips factories in Eindhoven in the Dutch colonies.
  - Opening of the first regular telegraphy -Dienstes between Berlin and Vienna.
  - First commercial sound films ("The Jazz Singer", USA) using the "Needle sound" back in sync with the film screening for LPs over loudspeakers.
  - First public television broadcasts in the UK by John Logie Baird between London and Glasgow and in the US by Frederic Eugene Ives (1882–1953) between Washington and New York.
  - The American inventor Philo Taylor Farnsworth (1906–1971) developed in Los Angeles, the first fully electronic television system in the world.
  - John Logie Baird developed his Phonovision, the first videodisc player. 30-line television images are stored on shellac records. At 78 RPM mechanically scanned, the images can be played back on his "telescreen". It could not play sound nor keep up with the rapidly increasing resolution of television. More than 40 years later, commercial optical disc players came onto the market.
- 1928: Fritz Pfleumer got the first tape recorder patent. It replaces steel wire with paper coated in iron powder. According to Valdemar Poulsen (1898) to the second crucial pioneer of magnetic sound, image and data storage
  - Dénes Mihály presented in Berlin a small circle, the first authentic television broadcast in Germany, having worked at least since 1923 in this field.
  - August Karolus and the company Telefunken put on the "fifth Great German Radio Exhibition Berlin 1928" the prototype of a television receiver, with an image size of 8 cm × 10 cm and a resolution of about 10,000 pixels, a much better picture quality than previous devices.
  - In New York (USA) the first regular television broadcasts of the experiment station WGY, operated by the General Electric Company (GE). Sporadic television news and dramas radiate from these stations by 1928.
    - The first commercially produced television receiver of the Daven Corporation in Newark is offered for $75.
  - John Logie Baird transmits the first television pictures internationally, and the same across the Atlantic from London to New York. He also demonstrated the world's first color television transmission in London.
- 1929
  - Edison withdraws from the phono business – the disk has ousted the cylinder.
  - The company Columbia Records developed the first portable record player that can be connected to any tube radio. It also created the first radio / phonograph combinations, the precursor to the 1960s music chests.

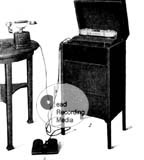
Daylygraph wire recorder

  - The German physicist Curt Stille (1873–1957) records magnetic sound for film, on a perforated steel band. First, this "Magnettonverfahren" has no success. Years later it is rediscovered for amateur films, providing easy dubbing. A "Daylygraph" or Magnettongerät had amplifier and equalizer, and a mature Magnettondiktiergerät called "Textophon".
  - Based on patents, which he had purchased of silence, brings the Englishman E. Blattner the " Blattnerphone "the first magnetic sound recording on the market. It records on a thin steel band.
  - The first sound film using optical sound premiers. Since the early 1920s, various people have developed this method. The same optoelectronic method also allows for the first time the post-processing of recorded music to sound recordings of it.
  - The director Carl Froelich (1875–1953) turns "The Night Belongs to Us", the first German sound film.
  - 20th Century Fox presents in New York on an 8 m × 4 m big screen the first widescreen movie.
  - The radio station Witzleben begins in Germany with the regular broadcasting of television test broadcasts, initially on long wave with 30 lines (= 1,200 pixels) at 12.5 image changes per second. It appear first blueprints for television receiver.
  - John Logie Baird starts in the UK on behalf of the BBC with regular experimental television broadcasts to the public.
  - Frederic Eugene Ives transmits a color television from New York to Washington.
- 1930
  - Manfred von Ardenne invented and developed the flying-spot scanner, Europe's first fully electronic television camera tube.
  - In Britain, the first television advertising and the first TV interview
- 1931
  - The British engineer and inventor Alan Dower Blumlein (1903–1942) invents "Binaural Sound", today called "Stereo". He developed the stereo record and the first three-way speaker. He makes experimental films with stereo sound. Then he becomes leader of the development team for the EMI-405-line television system.
  - The company RCA Victor presents to the public the first real LP record, the 35 cm diameter and 33.33 RPM give sufficient playing time for an entire orchestral work. But the new turntables are initially so expensive that they are only gain broad acceptance after the Second World War – then as vinyl record.
  - The French physicist René Barthélemy in Paris broadcasts the first television signal from a radio transmitter rather than by wire. The BBC launches first Tonversuche in the UK.
  - Public World Premiere of electronic television – without electro-mechanical components such as the Nipkow disk – on the "eighth Great German Radio Exhibition Berlin 1931 ". Doberitz / Pomerania is the first German location for a tone-TV stations.
  - Manfred von Ardenne can be the principle of a color picture tube patent: Narrow strips of phosphors in the three primary colors are closely juxtaposed arranged so that they complement each other with the electron flow to white light. A separate control of the three colors has not yet provided.
- 1932
  - The company AEG and BASF start for the magnetic tape method of Fritz Pfleumer to care (1928). They develop new devices and tapes, in which celluloid is used instead of paper as a carrier material.
  - In Britain, the BBC sends first radio programs time-shifted instead of live.
  - The company telephone and radio apparatus factory Ideal AG (today Blaupunkt) provides a car radio using Bowden cables to control it from the steering column.
- 1933
  - After the Nazi seizure of power in Germany is broadcasting finally a political tool. Systematic censorship is to prevent opposition and spread the "Aryan culture". Series production of the " People's recipient VE 301 "starts.
  - Edwin Howard Armstrong demonstrates that frequency-modulated (FM) radio transmissions are less susceptible to interference than amplitude-modulated (AM). However, practical application is long delayed.
  - In the USA the first opened drive-in theater.
- 1934: First commercial stereo recordings find little favor – the necessary playback devices are still too expensive. The term "High Fidelity" is embossed around this time.
- 1935
  - AEG and BASF place at the Berlin Radio Show, the tape recorder " Magnetophon K1 "and the appropriate magnetic tapes before. In case of fire in the exhibition hall all four exhibited devices are destroyed.
  - In Germany the world's first regular television program operating for about 250 mostly public reception points starts in Berlin and the surrounding area. The mass production of television receivers is – probably due to the high price of 2,500 Reichsmarks – not yet started.
  - At the same time, the research institute of the German Post (RPF) begins with development work for a color television methods, but which are later reinstated due to the Second World War.
- 1936
  - Olympic Games in Berlin broadcast live.
  - "Olympia suitcase", battery-powered portable radio receiver, introduced.
  - The first mobile television camera (180 lines, all-electronic) is used for live television broadcasts of the Olympic Games.
  - Also in the UK are first regular television broadcasts – now for the perfect electronic EMI system, which soon replaced the mechanical part Baird system – broadcast.
  - Video telephony connections between booths in Berlin and Leipzig. Later connections from Berlin to Nuremberg and Munich added.
  - The Frenchman Raymond Valtat reports on a patent, which describes the principle of working with binary numbers abacus.
  - Konrad Zuse works on a dual electromechanical computing machine that is ready in 1937.
- 1937
  - First sapphire needle for records of the company Siemens
  - The interlaced video method is introduced on TVr to reduce image flicker. The transmitter Witzleben uses the new standard with 441 lines and 25 image changes, i.e. 50 fields of 220 half-lines. Until the HDTV era the interlace method remains in use.
  - First movie encoder make it possible not to send the TV live, but to rely on recordings.
- 1938
  - The improved AEG tape-recorder "Magnetophon K4" is first used in radio studios. The belt speed is 77 cm / s, which at 1000 m length of tape has a playing time of 22 minutes.
  - Werner Flechsig invents the shadow mask method for separate control of the three primary colors in a color picture tube.
- 1939
  - On the "16th Great German Radio and television broadcasting exhibition Berlin 1939 ", the" German Unity television receiver E1 "and announces the release of free commercial television. Due to the difficult political and economic situation, only about 50 devices are sold instead of the planned 10,000.
  - In the USA the first regular television broadcasts take place.
- 1940
  - The development of television technology for military purposes increases the resolution to 1029 lines at 25 frames per second. Commercial HDTV television reached that resolution almost half a century later.
  - The problem of band noise with tape devices is reduced dramatically by the invention of radio frequency bias of Walter Weber and Hans-Joachim von Braunmühl.
- 1942: The first all-electronic computer is used by John Vincent Atanasoff, but quickly fades into oblivion. Four years later the ENIAC completed – the beginning of the end of Electromechanics in computers and calculators.
- 1945–1947: American soldiers capture in Germany some tape recorders. This and the nullified German patents leads to the development of the first tape recorders in the United States. The first home device " Sound Mirror "by the Brush Development Co. is there on the market.
- 1948
  - The American physicist and industrialist Edwin Herbert Land (1909–1991) launches the first instant camera, Polaroid camera Model 95 on the market.
  - Three American engineers at Bell Laboratories (John Bardeen, Walter Brattain and William Shockley) invent the transistor. Its lesser size and power compared with electron tubes brings (from 1955) portable radio receivers starting its march through all areas of electronics.
  - The Hungarian-American physicist Peter Carl Goldmark (1906–1977) invents the vinyl record (first published 1952), much less noisy than their predecessors shellac. Thanks to micro-groove (100 grooves per cm) can play 23 minutes per side. The LP record is born. This one is the redemption of the claim "high fidelity one step closer" to the end of the shellac era.
  - The Radio Corporation of America (RCA) leads the music format with 45 RPM records, later to conquer the market for cheap players. The first publication in Germany in this format appears 1953rd
  - The British physicist Dennis Gabor (1900–1979) invents holography. This method of recording and reproducing image with coherent light allows three-dimensional images. It was not until 1971 when the procedure gained practical importance, he received the Nobel Prize for Physics.
- 1949
  - In Germany, FM broadcasting starts regular program operation.
  - Experimentally since 1943, series production since 1949 there are for professional use stereo – Tonbandgeräte and matching ribbons. Also portable devices for reporters, initially propelled by a spring mechanism, has been around since 1949
- 1950
  - In the USA the first prerecorded audio tapes are marketed.
  - Also in the USA the company Zenith markets the first TV with cable remote control for channel selection.
- 1951
  - The CBS (Columbia Broadcasting System) broadcasts in New York the first color television program in the world, but using the field sequential standard, not reaching to the resolution of the black and white television and was to be incompatible.
  - With the " tape recorder F15 "from AEG 's first home tape recorder appears on the German market.
  - RCA Electronic Music is the first synthesizer prior to the creation of artificial electronic sounds.
- 1952
  - Reintroduction of regular television broadcasts in Germany after the Second World War.
  - 20th Century Fox developed with "Cinemascope" the most successful wide-screen process to better compete with television. Only some 50 years later pulls the TV with the 16: 9 size screen after.
- 1953
  - The "National Television System Committee" (Abbreviated as NTSC) normalized in the USA named after her black-and-white-compatible NTSC -Farbfernseh process. A year later, this method is introduced in the United States.
  - The car radio top model "Mexico" from Becker for the first time to an FM area (in mono) and an automatic tuning.
- 1954
  - RCA developed for the first apparatus for recording video signals on magnetic tapes. 22 km magnetic tape are needed per hour. By 1956, succeeds the company Ampex through the use of multiple tracks, the tape speed to more practicable 38.1 cm / s lower.
  - The European Broadcasting Union is founded "Euro Vision".
  - First regular television broadcasts in Japan.
- 1955
  - The second generation "TRADIC" (Transistorized Digital Computer), first to use only transistors therefore much smaller and more powerful than its predecessor tube computers.
  - The Briton Narinder Singh Kapany investigated the propagation of light in fine glass fibers (optical fibers).
  - The first wireless remote control for a television US-based Zenith consists of a better flashlight, with which one lights up in one of the four devices corners to turn the unit on or off, change the channel or mute the sound.
- 1956
  - The company Metz introduces radio device type 409 / 3D. First mass production of printed circuit boards. This follows since the 1930s, several improvements to the manufacturing technology.
  - The company Ampex introduces the "VR 1000" the first video recorder. That same year, CBS uses it for the first magnetic video tape recording (VTR) from. Although other programs are produced in color since 1954, the VTR cannot record color.
- 1957: The Frenchman Henri de France (1911–1986) developed the first generation of color TV system SECAM, which avoids some of the problems of the NTSC method. The weaknesses of the SECAM system be fixed in later modifications of the standard for the most part.
- 1958
  - By merging the Edison patents and the Berliner, the Blumlein stereo recording method becomes commercially viable. The company Mercury Records launches the first stereo record on the market.
  - The company Ampex expands the video recorder with the Model "VR 1000 B" to give it color capability.

== See also ==
- Electronics
- History of electronic engineering
- List of electrical engineering journals
- List of electrical engineers
- Timeline of historic inventions
- Timeline of heat engine technology
- Timeline of quantum computing and communication
- Timeline of computing
- Computer History Museum
