= Common control physical channel =

Broadcast channel in mobile telecoms

CCPCH stands for Common Control Physical CHannel in UMTS and some other CDMA communications systems. It is a broadcast radio channel by which a mobile phone or user equipment can decode and determine important system parameters before establishing a dedicated communications link.

In a FDD UMTS system, there are two CCPCH- Primary and Secondary. Exactly one Primary-CCPCH, which has a data rate of 27 kbit/s and is always broadcast using Channelisation Code C_{ch,256,1}. This channel can be detected by mobiles due to its fixed channelisation code, slot format and TTI, as well as being time aligned to the Synchronisation Channel which replaces the first 2 bits of P-CCPCH in every slot. The Broadcast Control Channel (BCH) transport channel is mapped onto the P-CCPCH, allowing mobiles to decode important system parameters prior to establishing a dedicated connection. One or more Secondary-CCPCHs are also provided to broadcast paging blocks and FACH messages.

The P-CCPCH in a TDD-mode UMTS system also carries pilot bits in (in contrast to FDD-mode, which provides a distinct pilot channel named CPICH). The pilot bits on the CCPCH can be used for measurements of the signal quality (e.g. RSCP, Ec/Io, etc.) and for synchronisation and timing reference when decoding other channels from the same transmitter.

== References and further reading ==
- A definition for CCPCH in UMTS can be found in 3GPP 25.211 Physical channels and mapping of transport channels onto physical channels (FDD) and 25.221 Physical channels and mapping of transport channels onto physical channels (TDD) (These are not easy to read documents as they are intended for an audience with substantial and detailed knowledge of the subject. Like many other standards and specifications, these texts merely define what has been agreed to be a common standard without actually explaining the used terms and categories—they expects the reader to be familiar with the terminology and the technology in general and in specifics too. Apart from the above, these documents are perhaps the most definite source of information on channels, CCPCH included, in UMTS.)
- A definition for Ec/Io applicable to CCPCH can be found in 3GPP 25.133 Requirements for support of radio resource management (FDD) and 25.123 Requirements for support of radio resource management (TDD)
- Some information on CCPCH is given in 3GPP 25.104 Base Station (BS) radio transmission and reception (FDD) and 25.105 Base Station (BS) radio transmission and reception (TDD)

== See also ==
- Universal Mobile Telecommunications System
