= Print-through =

Transfer of content between magnetic tape layers

Diagram of print-through leaving echoes (A, C) of a signal (B) on a tape

Print-through is a generally undesirable effect that arises in the use of magnetic tape for storing analog signals, in which a signal recorded on one section of tape is transferred onto other sections in close proximity. It is caused by the pattern of magnetic fields recorded on the source tape influencing the ferromagnetic particles in adjacent tape to align with the source.

Print-through is experienced as an unintended artefact when audio recordings are stored on reels, with layers wound closely together, causing pre- and post-print echoes on playback. After the advent of videotape, the mechanics behind print-through were applied to quickly duplicate tapes. In the context of videotape duplication, print-through is more often referred to as contact recording or contact printing.

== Mechanism ==
Print-through is a result of magnetic remanence left on affected tape by the magnetic field recorded on a source tape. Print-through can be induced under two conditions:

1. Isothermal remanence: Sections of tape are put in contact without an external magnetic field. Affects the smallest particles in the tape first and increases in level with temperature. If such an exposure is performed at a high temperature before lowering the temperature after exposure, this type of print-through can become more permanent, akin to the thermoremanent magnetization of igneous rocks in nature.
2. Anhysteretic remanence: Sections of tape are put in contact and exposed to a changing external magnetic field. The signal from the source tape acts as a DC bias on an alternating signal, which demagnetizes the target tape. For greatest effect from such an exposure, the source tape needs to be of a harder coercivity than the target, or it too will be demagnetized.

Isothermal remanence is the most common form of print-through, as magnetic tape stored on reels is not often exposed to strong magnetic fields (and when it is, each layer is of the same coercivity, so the major effect is more often the erasure of the recorded information rather than print-through).

=== Strength of printed signal ===
The strength of the printed signal with respect to the original depends on several variables:

1. Proximity of exposure. When tape is stored in reels, the proximity is determined by the thickness of the base films; thin C-90 cassette tapes are more susceptible than studio master tapes that use a base film four times thicker.
2. Time of exposure. The longer the tapes are in contact, the greater the print-through, though printed strength with respect to time follows an exponential decay curve, such that most of the transfer occurs quickly after exposure.
3. Temperature of exposure. Higher temperatures result in increasing amounts of print-through.
4. Coercivity of the ferromagnetic particles in the target tape. Average particle size, shape and material determine the strength of the magnetic field needed to coerce the tape to align with an external field.
5. Wavelength of source signal. The amount of print-through with respect to signal wavelength follows a curve dependent on the separation between source and target tapes. The peak occurs at a wavelength λ = 2πd, where d is the separation. The corresponding frequency depends on the tape speed and is equal to f = S/λ, where S is the speed. In contexts where contact printing is used for duplication, this places a limit on the bandwidth of signals that can be adequately copied.

=== Anti-print tapes ===
To guard against unintended print-through during storage, manufacturers may produce tapes with thicker base films or higher coercivity.

In videotapes, analog video is recorded by frequency-modulation of the video signal, and the FM capture effect shields the signal against print-through. However, the linear audio and (depending on format) chrominance signals of a video cassette may still have some print effects.

Digital tapes are less affected by print-through, as a greater level of corruption is necessary to cause bit errors. However, they can also be affected by contact print effects in a phenomenon known as bit-shift when upper or lower layers of tape cause a middle layer to alter the pulses recorded to represent binary information.

=== End-user mitigation ===
End users can mitigate the effect of print-through by maintaining a consistent temperature. Furthermore, by storing A-wind tapes head out and B-wind tapes tail out, pre-print echoes can be reduced in favor of post-print echoes, due to the geometry of base and coating layers. Post-print echoes are less intrusive because they occur after the onset of a sound, rather than in the preceding silence.

== Video recording ==
While print-through is a form of unwanted noise, contact printing was used deliberately for high-speed recording (duplication, high-speed en masse copying) of video tape, instead of having to record thousands of tapes on thousands of VCRs at normal playback speed, or alternatively on over 48-hour-long large reels (pancakes) of tape which then were inserted into cassettes. DuPont in conjunction with Otari invented a form of thermal magnetic duplication ("TMD") by which a high-coercivity metal mother master tape was brought into direct contact with a chromium dioxide copy (slave) tape. The coercivity of the mother tape is higher than that of the copy tape, so when the copy tape is heated and brought into contact with the mother tape, the copy tape gets a mirror image of the signal on the mother tape without the mother tape losing its signal. The recording on the mother tape was a mirror image of a valid video signal. Immediately before the copy tape came into contact with the mother tape, a focused laser beam heated it to its Curie point at which its value of coercivity dropped to very low values so that it picked up a near perfect copy of the mother tape as it cooled. The mother tape was made using a special reel to reel video tape recorder called a mirror master recorder and was held inside the machine in an endless loop. This system could achieve speeds of up to 300 times playback speed in NTSC VHS SP mode, 900 times in VHS EP mode and 428 times in PAL/SECAM tapes.

Sony developed a system known as sprinter that used a similar mother master tape forced into close contact with any blank copy tape using compressed air and run across a rotating transfer head in which a weak AC high-frequency sine wave is used to transfer the information anhysteretically to the copy tape with minimal erasure of the mother tape on each pass. The sprinter does not use a laser to heat the copy tape, which saves on power consumption. The transfer head may have a vacuum cleaner to reduce dropout caused by dust. This system was used to quickly duplicate VHS tapes at speeds of up to 240 times faster than playback speed for NTSC and 342 times for PAL/SECAM video signals without having to use expensive chrome dioxide tape; the tape was fed into the sprinter at a speed of 8 meters per second. The mother tape was enclosed in a space (not in a reel, but rather in an endless loop) in the sprinter; this was made possible by a horizontal vibrating tape feed system where the edge of the endless loop tape sits in a table that diagonally vibrates using vibration generated by piezoelectric elements and amplified using mechanical oscillation, causing the tape in the table to move forward. The copy tape was unwound, recorded using the mother tape, then wound onto large reels (called pancakes) containing enough tape for several VHS cassettes. The mother tape had a coercivity three times that of normal VHS tape and was made by recording onto it using a special reel-to-reel video tape recorder called a mirror mother VTR using video from a D-2 (video), Type B videotape or Type C videotape master source tape. The video tape recorder had a sapphire blade to clean the surface of the mother tape, reducing dropout caused by dust. Sprinter mother tapes suffered enough loss that they had to be replaced after a number of passes. The master had to be replaced every 1000 copies. This form of high-speed recording was very cost effective when recording in the EP (extra long play) mode because it was three times faster than recording in SP (standard play) mode, while real-time recording took the same amount of time, whether in EP mode, which used less tape, or SP mode, which used a greater amount of tape. High-speed video recording of EP video produced far more consistent results than real-time recording at the slowest VHS speed. After duplication, the copy tape was loaded into video tape loaders that wound the tape into empty VHS cassette shells that contained only leader tape.

== See also ==
- Pre-echo / post-echo
- Forward echo
- Crosstalk
- Audio spill
- Microphonics
