= Ratio detector =

A ratio detector using solid-state diodes

The ratio detector is a type of detector circuit, commonly used in radio receivers for demodulating frequency modulated (FM) signal.

The ratio detector is a variant of the Foster–Seeley discriminator, but one diode conducts in an opposite direction, and using a tertiary winding in the preceding transformer. The output in this case is taken between the sum of the diode voltages and the center tap. The output across the diodes is connected to a large value capacitor, forming a dynamic limiter. The ratio detector has the advantage over the Foster–Seeley discriminator that it does not respond to amplitude modulation (AM) signals, thus potentially saving a limiter stage; however, the output is only 50% of the output of a discriminator for the same input signal. The ratio detector has wider bandwidth, but more distortion than the Foster–Seeley discriminator.

== Amplitude noise suppression ==
The suppression of the effect of amplitude variation of the incoming signal on the output of the ratio detector is based on the principle of RF dynamic limiting:

A large value reservoir capacitor (C4) and bleeding resistor(s) (R1, R2) are connected across the diodes. The RF signal is rectified by the diodes and the rectified DC voltage charges the reservoir capacitor, while a small steady current bleeds through the resistor(s), continuously discharging it. This results in a constant steady load and a moderate damping effect on the tuned circuit.

As the amplitude of the signal increases, the higher rectified voltage results in an inrush current towards the reservoir capacitor; the increased load results in an increased damping of the tuned circuit, resulting in nearly constant amplitude on the output despite the amplitude increase of the incoming signal.

Similarly, a decrease in the input signal amplitude results in decreased (or ceased) current flow towards the charged reservoir capacitor, resulting in decreased- or no damping on the tuned circuit.

The values of the reservoir capacitor and the bleeding resistor(s) are chosen so that the combined time constant of these components is below the audio spectrum.
