= SHORAN =

Type of aircraft navigation and bombing system

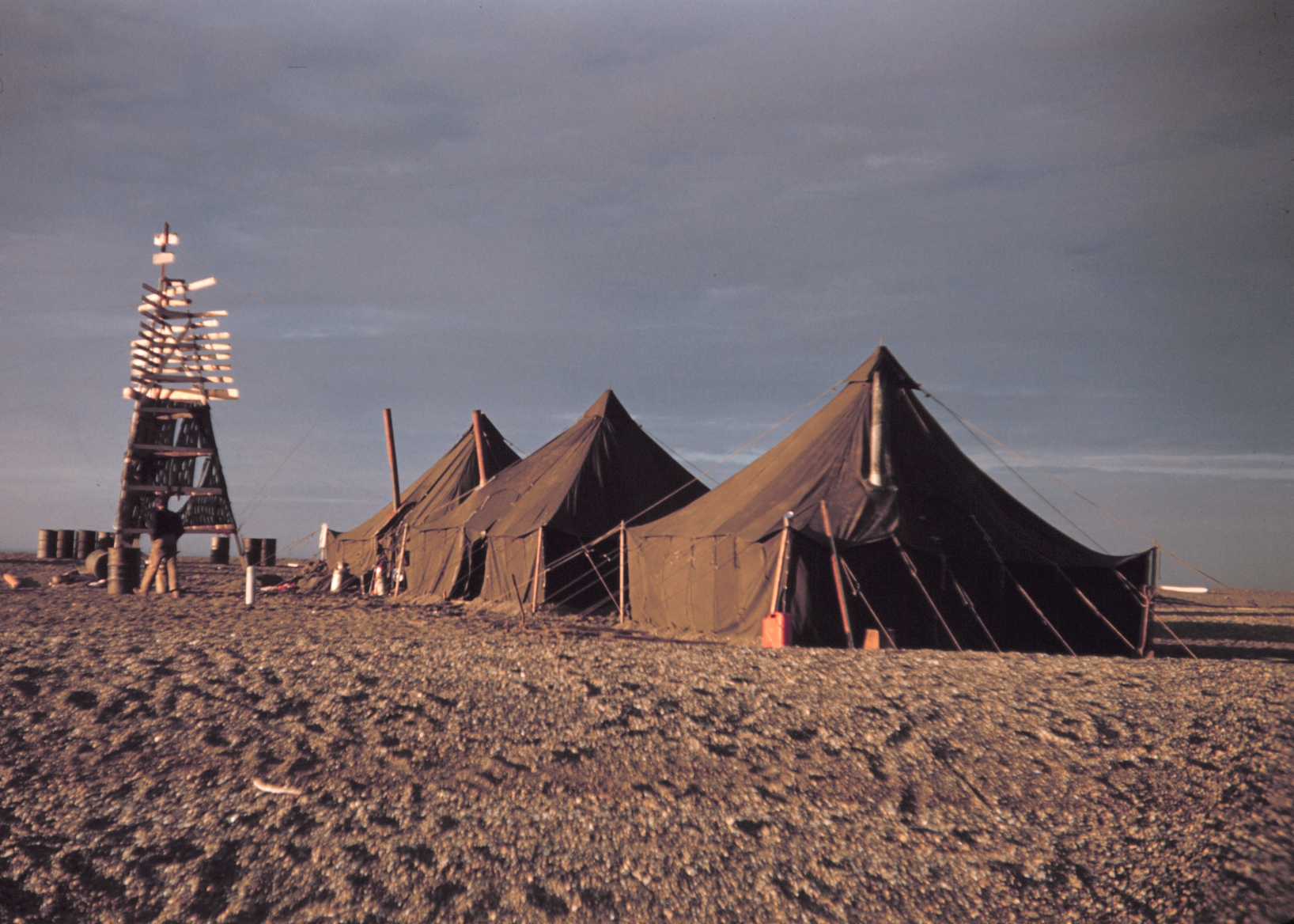
A Shoran navigation shore station in Alaska's North Slope, summer 1950.

SHORAN is an acronym for SHOrt RAnge Navigation, a type of electronic navigation and bombing system using a precision radar beacon. It was developed during World War II and the first stations were set up in Europe as the war was ending, and was operational with Martin B-26 Marauders based in Corsica, and later based in Dijon and in B-26s given to the South African Airforce in Italy. The first 10/10 zero visibility bombing was over Germany in March 1945. It saw its first combat use in the B-25, B-26 and B-29 bomber aircraft during the Korean War.

SHORAN used ground-based transponders to respond to interrogation signals sent from the bomber aircraft. By measuring the round-trip time to and from one of the transponders, the distance to that ground station could be accurately determined. The aircraft flew an arcing path that kept it at a set distance from one of the stations. The distance to a second station was also being measured, and when it reached a set distance from that station as well, the bombs were dropped. The basic idea was similar to the Oboe system developed by the Royal Air Force, but in Oboe the transponder was on the aircraft. This limited Oboe to guiding a single aircraft per ground station, while SHORAN could guide dozens, limited only by how rapidly the ground station's transponders could respond.

SHORAN was sent into combat due to the presence of the MiG-15 over Korea, which drove the B-29s from daylight combat in June 1951. Night operations were not very productive and the US Air Force became interested in any way to improve their results. The system was in place and the crews trained by November 1952, and SHORAN remained in use from then until the end of the war. It was particularly effective during early 1953 when the North Korean Air Force began to re-equip in case a new offensive opened. B-29s began the campaign, but only a dozen aircraft were available, so they were soon supplanted by B-26s to maintain constant bombing of the airfields. The possible offensive never occurred; the armistice was signed in July. It was not used after that point, due to Strategic Air Command's increasing focus on long-range bombing with nuclear weapons. Although SHORAN was used by the military only briefly, surplus equipment soon found a new use in the oil and gas industry, where it was used to position ships with high accuracy for seismic measurements.

== Origin ==
In 1938 RCA engineer Stuart William Seeley, while attempting to remove "ghost" signals from an experimental television system, realized that he could measure distances by time differences in radio reception. In summer 1940, Seeley proposed building SHORAN for the Army Air Force. Contract was awarded 9 months later, and SHORAN given its first military flight tests in August 1942. First procurement was spring 1944, with initial combat operations in northern Italy on December 11, 1944.

During the system's development, Seeley and an RCA manager flew to England to describe the system to American and British air force personnel. There they observed the Oboe, which could guide only a single aircraft, unlike Shoran which could guide multiple. On the return flight, nearly all information on Shoran was lost in a plane crash, and Seeley was forced to recreate the records from his own memory. He received a Magellanic award for his work in 1960.

== Structure ==
SHORAN, which operates at 300 MHz, requires an airborne AN/APN-3 set and two AN/CPN-2 or 2A ground stations. The equipment on board the aircraft includes a transmitter, a receiver, an operator's console and a K-1A model bombing computer. The transmitter sends pulses to one of the ground stations and the system calculates the range in statute miles by clocking the elapsed time between transmitter pulse and the returned signal. The system was intended for use in navigation, but it became obvious that it would work well for blind targeting during bombing runs in poor visibility. The setup made up of the K-1A bombing computer combined with the navigation system was the first SHORAN. The SHORAN system is designed so that as the aircraft faces the target, the low-frequency station should be on the left, and the high-frequency station is on the right. This allows the computer to triangulate the two stations and the target.

== Limitations ==
The limitations of SHORAN included:

- A maximum range of 300 statute miles (480 km) and a clear radio path
- No more than 20 aircraft may contact a pair of stations at once
- Complex parameter calculations made prior to flight cannot be changed during the bomb run
- Station angle must be between 30 degrees and 150 degrees, and the exact geographical position of each of the two ground stations and the target must be known
- The 100-statute-mile (160 km) ambiguity must be recognized and taken into account
- There are only four possible approaches to any one target, each determined by the geometry of the system
- Because the system is line-of-sight limited, the plane must fly at altitudes above 14,000 feet (4,300 m) and sometimes as high as 16,000 feet (4,900 m), depending on local geography. These altitudes were not easily achieved by a fully loaded bomber and required full power from the engines.
- Only stationary targets can be attacked
- The use of statute miles instead of nautical miles may be confusing in some situations

== High tech bombing in Korea ==
Little new top-of-the-line technology was used in Korea, but SHORAN was an exception. B-26 planes were first equipped with the system in January, 1951, and first carried it into battle the following month.

Some problems immediately recognized were that ground stations tended to be too far from the targets, the ground and aircraft equipment was not maintained properly, few technicians knew how to work the equipment, and operators were too unfamiliar with Korean geography to use the system to the fullest extent.

Changes were made and by June 1951 ground stations were located in more useful areas, such as islands and mountaintops, and training of operators and technicians familiarized them with the system. By November 1952 these changes had developed SHORAN into a reliable accurate blind-bombing system which was used by B-29 and B-26 aircraft for the remainder of the war.

== Use in geodesy and the retriangulation of Great Britain ==
During the Retriangulation of Great Britain between 1935 and 1962, the Ordnance Survey primary triangulation of the British Isles was connected to both Norway and Iceland using HIRAN, an enhanced version of SHORAN. Survey connections extending from primary triangulation points in Scotland to triangulation points in Norway and Iceland were facilitated by the US Air Force under the implementation of a project known as the North Atlantic Tie.

Shortly after World War II, the US Air Force had carried out a readjustment of all the triangulations of continental Europe to produce a geodetic datum known as ED50, a single system on the Universal Transverse Mercator coordinate system. The North Atlantic Tie initiative aimed to create a geodetic link between North America and Europe, by measuring a trilateration network, and permitting the positioning of European triangulation stations relative to the North American Datum.

From July to September 1953, the US Air Force used HIRAN to survey a link between three geodetic stations in Norway and three on the Scottish mainland and Shetland islands. This marked the initial phase of a larger project which connected surveys of Norway, Iceland, and Greenland to Canada. The network linking Scotland to Norway comprised fifteen measured lines: three among the Norwegian stations, three among the Scottish and Shetlandic stations, and nine lines across the North Sea.

The SHORAN geodetic stations did not precisely match the geodetic triangulation stations, but the proximity was considered such that no significant error was ascribed to the transfer from one to the other. The Norwegian stations were:

- Skibmannshei
- Hellisøy fyrstasjon
- Eigeberg.

And the British stations were:

- Saxa Vord
- Warth Hill
- Mormond Hill 338.

Each of the fifteen survey lines was gauged by six line crossings at each of two altitude levels, totalling twelve crossings, all forming part of a survey mission. The distance between two survey stations was derived from the minimum sum of the signal transit times from a transmitter, carried in an aircraft flying across the line to be measured, to a pair of terminals at each end of the line and back. A mission was approved provided:

- at least four of the six crossings in each group did not deviate from the group mean by more than 0.003 miles (16 feet)
- the two group means agreed within 0.003 miles, and
- the flight condition appeared generally satisfactory.

The most inaccurate of the rejected survey missions deviated from the accepted measure by 0.0055 miles (29 feet), and the average disparity between a rejected measure and the mean of the accepted measures was 0.0013 miles (6 feet). The final results and assessment were computed from observation of ground survey positions, including stations in both Iceland and the Faroe Islands.

The operation was largely successful, but the Ordnance Survey considered that the results were not of a geodetic standard necessary for primary triangulation, and a 12 metres (39 ft) discrepancy existed in the measurements between Norwegian stations.

== Use in petroleum exploration ==
Beginning in the late 1940s and continuing into the 1980s surplus SHORAN systems had become widely used to provide precision navigation in oil and gas exploration industry. Companies like pioneer Offshore Navigation, Inc., Navigation Management, Coastal Surveys (based in Singapore) and Western Geophysical deployed SHORAN receivers to navigate seismic survey vessels and position drilling rigs around the world. The technology was key to the successful development of the offshore oil & gas industry in the postwar era. Truck-portable SHORAN transponders and up to 90-foot-tall (27 m) antennas were set up within a few feet of geodesic survey markers near the coast. SHORAN chains consisting of three or four shore stations were used to provide highly accurate navigation across large exploration tracts and as much as 200 miles (320 km) offshore. Frequently, the massive vacuum tube transmitters were fitted with solid-state control boxes for more reliable operation and to improve reception of weaker signals over the horizon.

== See also ==
- Alpha (radio navigation)
- Battle of the Beams
- CHAYKA
- GEE (navigation)
- G-H (navigation)
- Global positioning system
- LORAN
- Oboe (navigation)
- OMEGA Navigation System
- SCR-277
