= Transmission Time Interval =

TTI, Transmission Time Interval, is a parameter in UMTS (and other digital telecommunication networks) related to encapsulation of data from higher layers into frames for transmission on the radio link layer. TTI refers to the duration of a transmission on the radio link. The TTI is related to the size of the data blocks passed from the higher network layers to the radio link layer.

To minimize errors due to fading and interference on the radio link, data is divided at the transmitter into blocks and then the bits within a block are encoded and interleaved. The length of time required to transmit one such block determines the TTI. At the receiver all bits from a given block must be received before they can be deinterleaved and decoded. Having decoded the bits the receiver can estimate the bit error rate (BER). And because the shortest decodable transmission is one TTI the shortest period over which BER can be estimated is also one TTI. Thus in networks with link adaptation techniques based on the estimated BER the shortest interval between reports of the estimated performance, which are used to adapt to the conditions on the link, is at least one TTI. In order to be able to adapt quickly to the changing conditions in the radio link a communications system must have shorter TTIs. In order to benefit more from the effect of interleaving and to increase the efficiency of error-correction and compression techniques a system must, in general, have longer TTIs. These two contradicting requirements determine the choice of the TTI.

In UMTS Release '99 the shortest TTI is 10 ms and can be 20 ms, 40 ms, or 80 ms. In UMTS Release-5 the TTI for HSDPA is reduced to 2ms. This provides the advantage of faster response to link conditions and allows the system to quickly schedule transmissions to mobiles which temporarily enjoy better than usual link conditions. As a result the system most of the time transmits data over links which are better than the average conditions, because of this the bit rates in the system most of the time are higher than what the average conditions would allow. This leads to increase in system capacity.

In 1xEV-DO technology, a slot, which is not quite the same thing as the TTI, but which still fulfills a somewhat similar function, is 1.667 ms. In 1xEV-DV it has a variable length of 1.25 ms, 2.5 ms, 5 ms, and 10 ms.
