= Foster–Seeley discriminator =

Type of FM detector circuit

Foster-Seeley (or "phase") discriminator schematic.

The Foster–Seeley discriminator is a common type of FM detector circuit, invented in 1936 by Dudley E. Foster and Stuart William Seeley. The Foster–Seeley discriminator was envisioned for automatic frequency control of receivers, but also found application in demodulating an FM signal.

The Foster–Seeley discriminator uses a tuned RF transformer to convert frequency changes into amplitude changes. A transformer, tuned to the carrier frequency, is connected to two rectifier diodes. The circuit resembles a full bridge rectifier.

The phase of the voltage at the secondary coil depends on whether the carrier is below or above the resonance, resulting in a positive or negative shift, respectively.

The circuit makes use of the near-$90^\circ$ phase difference occurring between the voltages in two loosely coupled resonant circuits at the peak frequency.

Through the coupling capacitor $C_k$, the primary voltage is applied to the center tap of the secondary, producing a sum and a difference $V_{center} \plusmn \frac{V_{secondary}}{2}$ on the top and the bottom terminals thereof, respectively.

Depending on the changing phase relationship of the input signal — $V_{primary}$ (and therefore $V_{center}$) with $V_{secondary}$, the amplitude of the sum/difference at the upper or lower half, respectively, will be higher, which results in a change of the voltage across the output capacitors. The choke $L3$, sometimes replaced by a resistor, provides a DC path through the rectifier diodes.

The demodulator's bandwidth depends on the Q factor of the resonant circuit; the phase response of the secondary (and therefore, the voltage response of the circuit) to $\Delta{f}$ is an S-curve.

Foster–Seeley discriminators are sensitive to both frequency and amplitude variations, unlike some detectors. Therefore a limiter amplifier stage must be used before the detector, to remove amplitude variations in the signal which would be detected as noise. The limiter acts as a class-A amplifier at lower amplitudes; at higher amplitudes it becomes a saturated amplifier which clips off the peaks and limits the amplitude.

== See also ==
- Slope detector
- Ratio detector
- Quadrature detector
- Phase-locked loop detector
