= Block Error Rate =

Metric used in LTE networks

Block Error Rate (BLER) is a ratio of the number of erroneous blocks to the total number of blocks transmitted on a digital circuit.

It is used in measuring the error rate when extracting data frames from a Compact Disc (CD). The BLER measurement is often used as a quality control measure with regard to how well audio is retained on a compact disc over time.

BLER is also used for W-CDMA performance requirements tests (demodulation tests in multipath conditions, etc.). BLER is measured after channel de-interleaving and decoding by evaluating the Cyclic Redundancy Check (CRC) on each transport block.

Block Error Rate (BLER) is used in LTE/4G technology to determine the in-sync or out-of-sync indication during radio link monitoring (RLM). Normal BLER is 2% for an in-sync condition and 10% for an out-of-sync condition.
