= S-SCH =

S-SCH stands for "Secondary Synchronization Channel in UMTS" (Universal Mobile Telecommunications System).

S-SCH is a pure downlink physical channel broadcast over the entire cell. It is transmitted unscrambled during the first 256 chips of each time slot, in time multiplex with Primary Common Control Physical Channel (P-CCPCH). It is the only channel that is not spread over the entire radio frame.

The S-SCH is repeated at the beginning of each time slot and the same code is used by all the cells and enables the UE to detect the existence of the UMTS cell. The slot synchronization is done using the P-SCH but S-SCH is used to synchronize the UE with the frame boundaries. It also enables the UE to identify the Primary Scrambling Code Group for the cell.

There are sixteen different codes for the 256 chips that are transmitted at the start of each time slot. Using these sixteen unique codes, 64 different code sequences are transmitted which serve two purposes. First the UE can identify the frame boundaries since the 64 sequences are known to a user equipment. Secondly the UE can identify the Primary Scrambling Code (PSC) group of the cell as every code sequence is assigned to a PSC group
