= Stuart William Seeley =

Stuart William Seeley (June 23, 1901 – November 4, 1978) was a noted American electrical engineer, best known for inventing the Foster–Seeley discriminator and SHORAN.

Seeley was born in Chicago, Illinois, and received his B.Sc. degree in electrical engineering from Michigan State College in 1925. From 1915 to 1924 he was an amateur radio experimenter and commercial operator, then worked at General Electric 1925–1926, Sparks Withington 1926–1935, and the RCA License Laboratory, starting in 1935.

In 1936, Seeley invented the Foster–Seeley discriminator with D. E. Foster, publishing details in 1937. It helped reduce the cost of FM radio receivers to a level comparable to AM receivers.

In 1938, while attempting to remove "ghost" signals from an experimental television system, Seeley realized that he could measure distances by time differences in radio reception. In summer 1940, Seeley proposed building SHORAN, a bombing navigation system for the United States Army Air Forces. Contract was awarded 9 months later, and SHORAN given its first military flight tests in August 1942. First procurement was spring 1944, with initial combat operations in northern Italy on December 11, 1944.

Seeley received the 1948 IEEE Morris N. Liebmann Memorial Award "for his development of ingenious circuits related to frequency modulation", and the 1960 Magellanic Premium from the American Philosophical Society for Shoran.

In 2007 the Pittsburgh Antique Radio Society published a bibliography of Seeley's writings. The U.S. Patents of Stuart W. Seeley (with a bibliography of Seeley's writings), 2nd edition, 2007.

== Selected works ==
- D. E. Foster and S. W. Seeley, "Automatic tuning, simplified circuits, and design practice," Proceedings of the IRE, vol. 25, pages 289–313, March 1937.
- "Frequency modulation", RCA Rev. vol 5, p 468, April 1941.
- S. W. Seeley and J. Avins, "The ratio detector," RCA Rev., vol. 8, pages 201–236, June 1947.
- "Shoran - A Precision Five Hundred Mile Yardstick", Proceedings of the American Philosophical Society, vol. 105, no. 4 (Aug. 15, 1961), pages 447–451.
