= Rxqual =

RxQual is used in GSM and is a part of the Network Measurement Reports (NMR).

This is an integer value which can be between 0 and 7 and reflects the quality of voice. 0 is the best quality, 7 is the worst.

Each RxQual value corresponds to an estimated number of bit errors in a number of bursts.

There are two types of RxQual values, FULL and SUB.

We use RxQual SUB when we have DTX DL activated because RxQual FULL values will not be reliable, because they will use Bit error rate (BER) measurements when nothing has been sent, what leads to a very high BER and a poor RxQual.

If DTX DL is deactivated, it is better to use RxQual FULL values. They are more precise, because they use all frames on the SACCH multiframe, whether they have been transmitted from the base station or not.

The official definition of RxQual is given in Chapter 8.2.4 of GSM TS 05.08 (ETSI TS 100 911), later superseded by 3GPP TS 45.008.

== See also ==
- Cellular network
- GSM
