= P-SCH =

P-SCH stands for "Primary Synchronisation Channel" in Universal Mobile Telecommunications System.The P-SCH is a pure downlink physical channel broadcast over the entire cell.

It is transmitted unscrambled during the first 256 chips of each time slot, in time multiplex with Primary Common Control Physical Channel (P-CCPCH). It is the only channel that is not spread over the entire radio frame. The P-SCH is repeated at the beginning of each time slot and the same code is used by all the cells and enables the UE to detect the existence of the UMTS cell and to synchronize itself on the time slot boundaries. This is normally done with a single matched filter or any similar device. The slot timing of the cell is obtained by detecting peaks in the matched filter output.

This channel is used in conjunction with S-SCH to search for a UMTS cell and synchronize with it.
