= Received signal code power =

Concept in mobile telecommunications

In the UMTS cellular communication system, received signal code power (RSCP) denotes the power measured by a receiver on a particular physical communication channel. It is used as an indication of signal strength, as a handover criterion, in downlink power control, and to calculate path loss. In CDMA systems, a physical channel corresponds to a particular spreading code, hence the name (Received signal code power). RSCP is also called Receiver Side Call Power.

While RSCP can be defined generally for any CDMA system, it is more specifically used in UMTS. Also, while RSCP can be measured in principle on the downlink as well as on the uplink, it is only defined for the downlink and thus presumed to be measured by the UE and reported to the Node B.
