= Capture effect =

FM radio reception phenomenon

In a radio receiver, the capture effect is a phenomenon associated with reception in which only the stronger of two or more signals received within the bandwidth of the receiver passband will be demodulated. The Capture effect therefore enables frequency reuse of the same frequency by imposing a sufficient distance separation, e.g. AM capture effect is used with AM communications in the AM(R)S (Aeronautical mobile (R) service), or between FM-BC transmitters for the FM capture effect. Alternatively, the capture effect enables two-frequency ILS-Localizer (ILS-LOC) and ILS-Glide-Path (ILS-GP) transmitters to operate at airports in presence of strong reflections, e.g. due to terrain and buildings.

== FM phenomenon ==
A form of the capture effect was observed by Edwin Armstrong in his early work on frequency modulation. In his 1936 paper to the IRE, he reported that one wideband FM signal could suppress interference from another at the same frequency unless the undesired signal exceeded approximately half the strength of the desired one. This represents a significantly higher interference threshold than in AM systems.

The capture effect is defined as the complete suppression of the weaker signal at the receiver's limiter (if present) where the weaker signal is not amplified, but attenuated. In FM communications, the capture effect results from the nonlinear limiting stages used in receivers to suppress amplitude noise. As a result, when two co-channel signals are present, the receiver demodulates the stronger signal while substantially suppressing the weaker signal. When both signals are nearly equal in strength or are fading independently, the receiver may rapidly switch from one to another and exhibit flutter.

The capture effect can occur at the signal limiter, or in the demodulation stage for circuits that do not require a signal limiter. Some types of radio receiver circuits have a stronger capture effect than others. The measurement of how well a receiver rejects a second signal on the same frequency is called its capture ratio. It is measured as the lowest ratio of the power of two signals that will result in the suppression of the weaker signal.

The capture effect phenomenon was reported prior to 1 February 1939 by General Electric engineers conducting test transmissions. Two experimental FM stations, located 15 miles (24 km) apart in Albany and Schenectady, New York, were configured to transmit on the same frequency, in order to study how this would affect reception. It was determined that, for most of the path between the two stations, only one of the signals could be heard, with the complete elimination of the other. It was concluded that this effect occurred whenever the stronger signal was about twice as strong as the weaker one. This was significantly different than the case with amplitude modulation signals, where the general standard for broadcasting stations was that to avoid objectionable interference, the stronger signal had to be about twenty times that of the weaker one. The capture effect thus allowed co-channel FM broadcasting stations to be located somewhat closer to each other than AM ones, without causing mutual interference.

== AM capture effect use ==
When AM (Amplitude Modulation) transmitters share the same center frequency, the weaker signal will introduce distortions in form of beat frequencies or both signals interfere completely with each other. If only a carrier devoid of modulation is received or added in a receiver, e.g. using a BFO (Beat Frequency Oscillator), a beat tone with the frequency offset between the two carrier frequencies will be heard.

By introducing a frequency offset between the carrier frequencies in the magnitude of at least the sum of the highest modulation frequencies employed by both transmitters, will eliminate generation of beat frequencies, e.g. highest modulation frequency is 2.4 kHz therefore the min. frequency offset between both carrier is 4.8 kHz (=2 x 2.4 kHz).

The capture effect is actively employed in Europe for aeronautical VHF-communication in the band 118 MHz to 137 MHz to provide coverage for aircraft flying under ATC (Air Traffic Control) in large ATC sectors that cannot be covered by a single transmitter site. For ATC large sectors up to five transmitter sites are required to provide continuous coverage within the area of a large ATC sector. Transmitters are strategically placed therefore ensuring that not all transmitters will be received at any point in space simultaneously.

Operation of instrument landing system localizer (ILS-LLZ) and instrument landing system glide path (ILS-GP) at airports is often impossible due to strong reflections, e.g. on terrain and buildings. The solution lead to the development of two-frequency ILS-LOC and ILS-GP. Two frequency ILS systems use an additional carrier frequencies with a frequency offset of at least 5 kHz and max. 14 kHz, both signals centered above and below the nominal center frequency of a 50 kHz wide ILS-LLZ-channel. ^{No. 3.1.3.2.1} Both signals are radiated with two independent antenna patterns that overlap only in part. The course signal of an ILS-LLZ has a higher EIRP to provide a range of up to 25 NM and a lower EIRP for the clearance of an ILS-Localizer signal to provide a range between 10 NM to 17 NM. For difficult terrain and weather impact 2f ILS-GP are employed. Two frequency ILS-LOC and ILS-GP are an ICAO standard precision approach system and are standardized for worldwide use in ICAO Annex 10.

AM receiver will demodulate any carriers and their side bands that are strong enough for demodulation within the receiver passband resulting in an audio mix, if their carrier frequencies are not separated by the sum of the highest modulation frequencies of employed in both transmitters. If only a carrier devoid of modulation is received or added in a receiver, e.g. using a BFO (Beat Frequency Oscillator) the resulting tone is the frequency offset between the two carrier frequencies. (Note: If AM signals are close but not exactly on the same frequency, the reception mix will not only have the audio from both carriers but depending on the carrier separation will include an audible heterodyne beat note equal to the difference between the carrier frequencies. For instance, if one carrier transmits at 1000.000 kHz, and the other at 1000.150 kHz, then a 150 Hz beat note tone mix will result. This mix can also occur when a second AM carrier is received on an adjacent frequency if the receiver's ultimate bandwidth is wide enough to include reception of both signals. In ITU Region 2 locations, consisting of the Americas, for the AM broadcast band this occurs at 10 kHz; elsewhere it can occur at 9 kHz, the AM band frequency spacing commonly used in the rest of the world. Where such an overlap within the passband occurs, a high-pitched heterodyne whistle at precisely 9 or 10 kHz can be heard. This is particularly common at night when signals from adjacent frequencies travel long distances due to skywave. Modern SDR-based receivers can eliminate this by utilizing a brick-wall filter narrower than the channel spacing, which reduces signals outside the passband to inconsequential levels.)

== Digital modulation ==
For digital modulation schemes it has been shown that for properly implemented on-off keying/amplitude-shift keying systems, co-channel rejection can be better than for frequency-shift keying systems.

== See also ==
- Near–far problem
