= Network Voice Protocol =

Pioneering VoIP protocol

- Communication protocol
- Abbreviation: NVP
- OSI layer: Application layer
- IP number: ST / ST-II (IP protocol version 5)
- RFC: 741 (Specification)

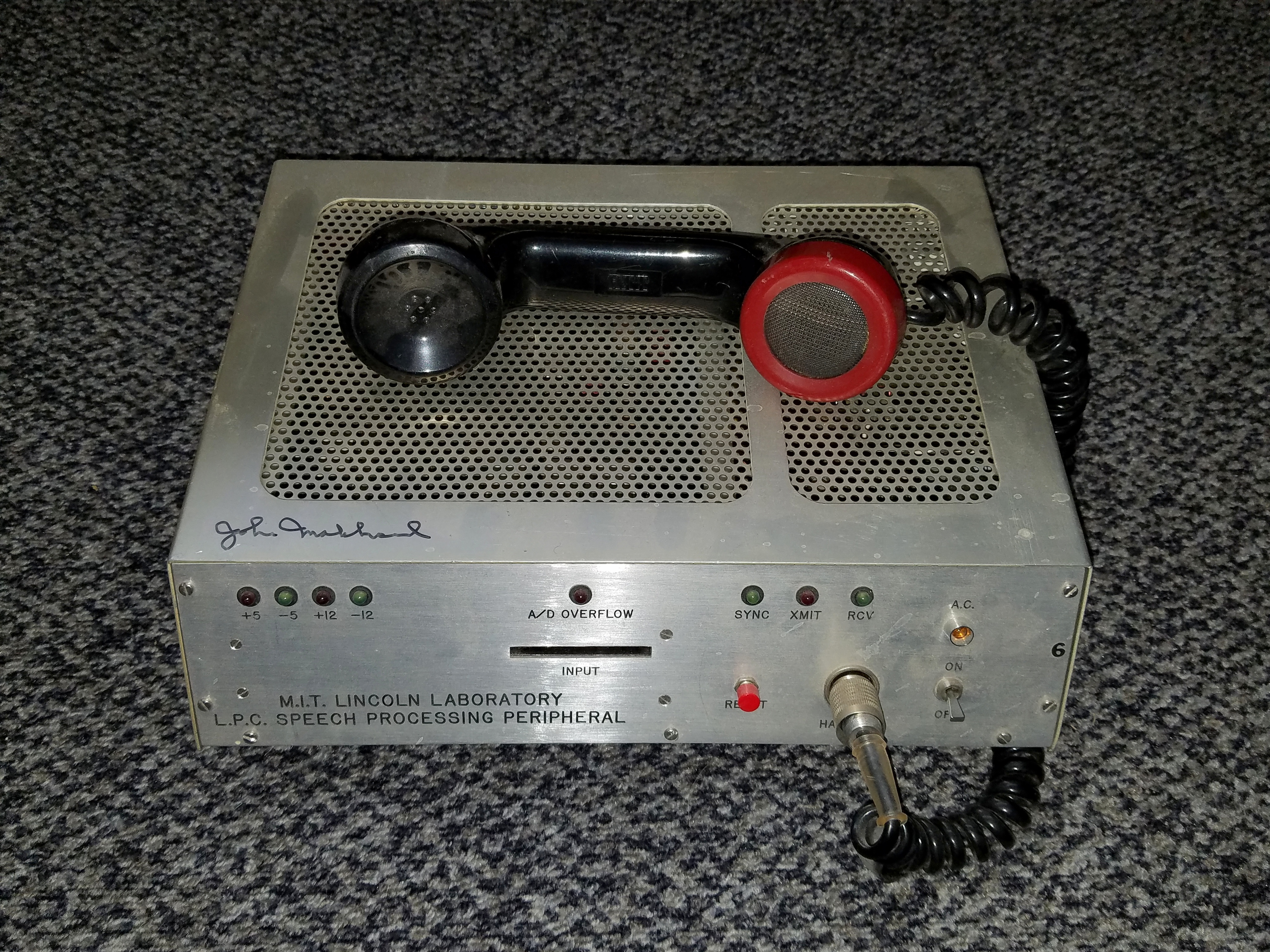
Prototype telephone for the Network Voice Protocol

The Network Voice Protocol (NVP) was a pioneering computer network protocol for transporting human speech over packetized communications networks. It was an early example of Voice over Internet Protocol technology.

== History ==
NVP was first defined and implemented in 1974, with the definition led by the Speech project at ISI, the USC Information Sciences Institute, following initial work begun in December 1973. ISI leadership was by Danny Cohen of the Information Sciences Institute (ISI), University of Southern California, with funding from ARPA's Network Secure Communications (NSC) program. The project's stated goals were "to develop and demonstrate the feasibility of secure, high-quality, low-bandwidth, real-time, full-duplex (two-way) digital voice communications over packet-switched computer communications networks...[and to] supply digitized speech which can be secured by existing encryption devices. The major goal of this research is to demonstrate a digital high-quality, low-bandwidth, secure voice handling capability as part of the general military requirement for worldwide secure voice communication."

NVP’s first demonstration was in August 1974 between the groups at ISI and MIT Lincoln Laboratory. That was history’s first “phone call” using a computer network. It was partly enabled by users of vocoders custom-built by BB&N, Bolt Beranek, and Newman. Work as a whole involved many other researchers nationally. Necessary subnet (IMP-to-IMP) changes for real-time packet forwarding were discussed at ISI in March 1974, chaired by Bob Kahn, DARPA’s program director for the speech project. At the end of the meeting, he summarized actions and directed BB&N to make the required subnet updates.

NVP was used to send speech between distributed sites on the ARPANET using several different voice-encoding techniques, including linear predictive coding (LPC) and continuously variable slope delta modulation (CVSD). Cooperating researchers included Steve Casner, Randy Cole, and Paul Raveling (ISI); Jim Forgie (Lincoln Laboratory); Mike McCammon (Culler-Harrison); John Markel (Speech Communications Research Laboratory); John Makhoul (Bolt, Beranek and Newman), and Rod McGuire and Philip Rubin (Haskins Laboratories).

NVP was used by experimental Voice Funnel equipment (circa February 1981), based on BBN Butterfly computers, as part of ongoing ARPA research into packetized audio. ARPA staff and contractors used the Voice Funnel, and related video facilities, to do three-way and four-way video conferencing among a handful of US East and West Coast sites.

Credit is also due to Dave Retz and his group at the UC Santa Barbara Speech Communication Laboratory. ISI used his operating system, ELF, for the early development of speech networking, including extension to speech conferencing.

== Protocol ==
The protocol consisted of two distinct parts: control protocols and a data transport protocol. Control protocols included relatively rudimentary telephony features such as indicating who wants to talk to whom; ring tones; negotiation of voice encoding; and call termination. Data messages contained encoded speech. For each encoding scheme (vocoder), a frame was defined as a packet containing the negotiated transmission interval of a number of digitized voice samples.

NVP was transported over the Internet Stream Protocol (ST) and a later version called Stream Protocol, version 2 (ST-II), both connection-oriented versions of the Internet Protocol (IP) and which carried the IP protocol version 5. These protocols may be viewed as early experiments in quality of service and connection-oriented network protocols such as Asynchronous Transfer Mode (ATM).
