= Chip Elliott =

American engineer

Chip Elliott is an American engineer, best known for his work in creating advanced computer networks.

Elliott was Northfield Mount Hermon School's first graduate as 1972 class orator, where he won the Bausch & Lomb science prize and was named a National Merit Scholar, then graduated from Dartmouth College, where he maintained and helped create computer language systems, including Algol 60, APL, Dynamo, and PL/I, for the Dartmouth Time-Sharing System. Subsequently, he was a founder of True BASIC, Inc. At BBN Technologies in the 1990s, he created the videoconferencing system for the Defense Simulation Internet, led the networking design and implementation of the Iris Digital Communications System, and served as network architect for the Near-term digital radio (NTDR) system. He also participated in the design of Connexion by Boeing, Celestri, Discoverer II, and SBIRS-Low.

In the early 2000s, Elliott led the design and build-out of the DARPA Quantum Network, which was the world's first quantum cryptography network, operating 10 optical nodes across the Boston region to provide highly secure key distribution non-stop through both telecom fibers and the atmosphere. He then served as the founding Project Director for GENI, the Global Environment for Network Innovations, a national suite of experimental infrastructure created across 60+ university campuses by the National Science Foundation for at-scale research in future internet architectures, services, and security. At his retirement, he was BBN's chief technology officer.

Elliott has served on panels in the US including for the Government Accountability Office, the Defense Science Board and boards for the Director of National Intelligence, Army, Navy, SOCOM, and DTO, and has held visiting and adjunct faculty positions at Dartmouth College, Tunghai University in Taiwan, and the Indian Institute of Technology, Kanpur. He holds over 90 issued patents, and has been named a Fellow of the American Association for the Advancement of Science, ACM Fellow, and Fellow of the Institute of Electrical and Electronics Engineers for contributions to the design and implementation of communication networking. For his leadership in quantum cryptography he was given Frost & Sullivan's Award for Excellence in Technology (2005) and named a World Technology Award Finalist (2004) and Fellow.
