= HCDR =

The acronym HCDR may refer to:

- High-capacity data radio
- The album Hate Crew Deathroll
