= Richard Bolt =

American physics professor (1911–2002)

Richard Henry Bolt (April 22, 1911 – January 13, 2002) was an American physics professor at the Massachusetts Institute of Technology (MIT) with an interest in acoustics. He was one of the founders of the company Bolt, Beranek and Newman, which built the ARPANET, a forerunner of the Internet.

== Early life ==
Bolt was born in Peking, China, where his parents were medical missionaries. His family returned to the U.S. in 1916 and settled in California.

Bolt graduated from Berkeley High School, California in 1928 and went to college and graduate school at the University of California, Berkeley.

Although he initially expected to major in either music or graphical design, he decided on architecture, in which he attained a BA in 1933. At that time, he had already developed an interest in acoustics, combining his interests for music, design and architecture.

After his marriage to Katherine Mary Smith, right after his graduation in 1933, they made a honeymoon to Europe, where he became acquainted with a number of scientists from Berlin, and the honeymoon was extended to ten months while Bolt learned German and studied acoustics.

== Berkeley ==
Returning to Berkeley in 1934, he entered the graduate physics program, and, earning an M.A. in 1937 and qualifying for Berkeley's Physics Ph.D. program, which he completed in 1939. He performed his research at UCLA, given the fact that Berkeley had no acoustics research facilities at that time. After attaining his PhD in 1939 he worked at MIT for a year on the transmission of sound in various shapes of rooms. Excluding a brief period at the University of Illinois and a stationing in London during WWII, he remained associated with the MIT until his retirement.

== MIT and BBN ==
Bolt started a consulting firm with another MIT professor, Leo Beranek, in 1948, and worked on such projects as doing an audio analysis of the JFK assassination, the "18.5 minute gap" in Nixon's White House tapes, and improving the sound in concert halls. In later years, after the addition of one of his former students, Robert Newman, the firm of Bolt, Beranek and Newman, better known as BBN, designed the first modem in 1963, helping computers communicate with each other. This led to work on the ARPANET, which became the Internet. BBN helped develop e-mail and, in 1971, one of BBN's researchers, Ray Tomlinson, chose the "@" sign for e-mail addresses. Bolt retired in 1976.

== See also ==
- Bolt, Beranek and Newman
