= Business interaction networks =

Business interaction networks are networks that enable businesses and their communities of interest to collaborate and conduct business online securely via the Internet.

Mary Johnston Turner first discussed the concept in a Network World opinion piece in August 1995, attributing the initial advocacy for the concept to the now-defunct BBN Planet, the ISP division of BBN Technologies.
