= Internet Stream Protocol =

Family of experimental protocols

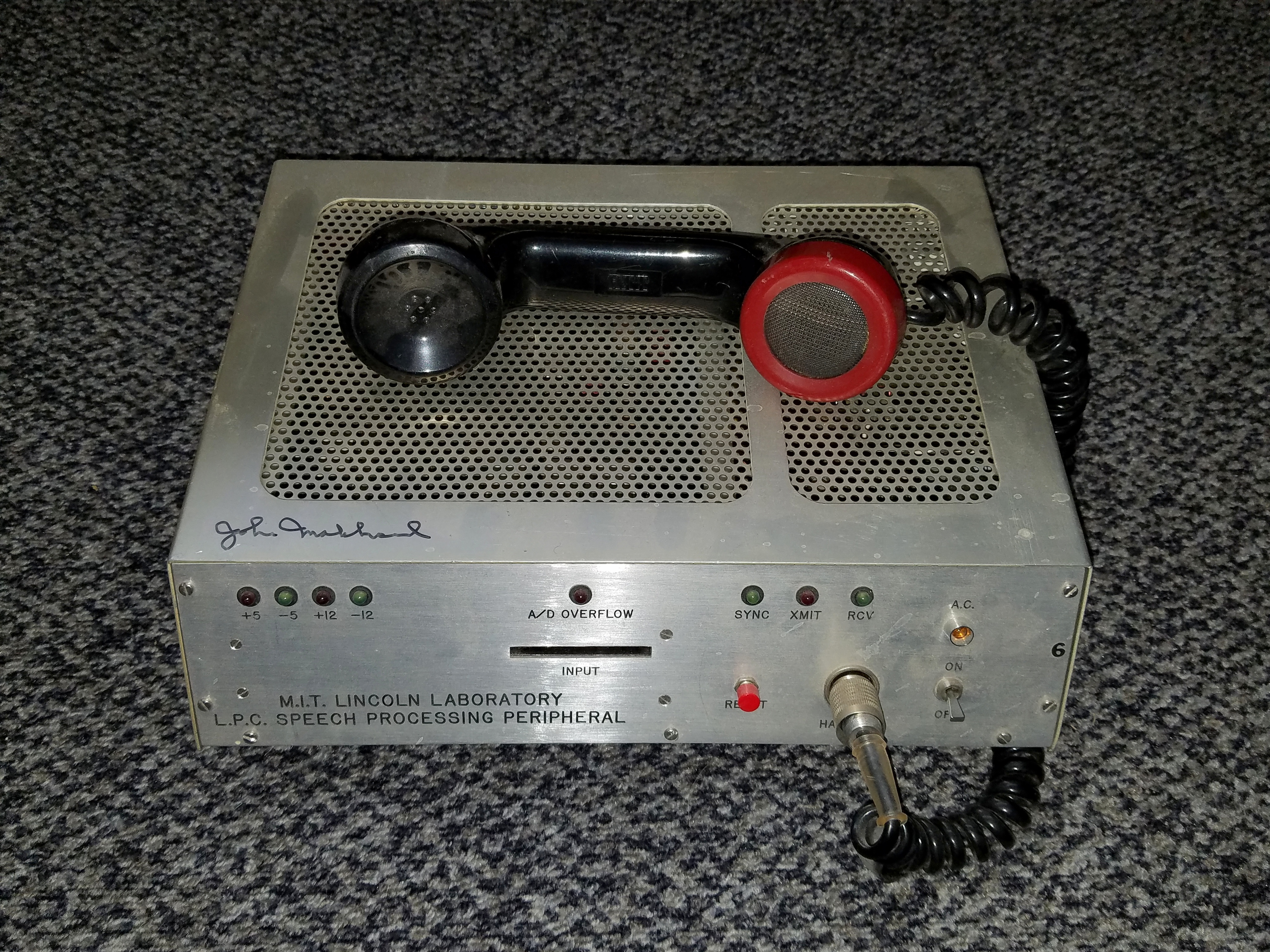
Prototype telephone for the Internet Stream Protocol

The Internet Stream Protocol (ST) is a family of experimental protocols first defined in Internet Experiment Note IEN-119 in 1979, and later substantially revised in RFC 1190 (ST-II) and RFC 1819 (ST2+). The protocol uses the version number 5 in the version field of the Internet Protocol header, but was never known as IPv5. The successor to IPv4 was thus named IPv6 to eliminate any possible confusion about the actual protocol in use.

== History ==
The Internet Stream Protocol family was never introduced for public use, but many of the concepts available in ST are similar to later Asynchronous Transfer Mode protocols and can be found in Multiprotocol Label Switching (MPLS). They also presaged voice over IP.

ST arose as the transport protocol of the Network Voice Protocol, a pioneering computer network protocol for transporting human speech over packetized communications networks, first implemented in December 1973 by Internet researcher Danny Cohen of the Information Sciences Institute (ISI) as part of ARPA's Network Secure Communications (NSC) project.

First specified in 1979, ST was envisioned as a connection-oriented complement to IPv4, operating on the same level, but using a different header format from that used for IP datagrams. According to IEN-119, its concepts were formulated by Danny Cohen, Estil Hoversten, and James W. Forgie. The protocol was notable for introducing the concepts of packetized voice (as used by voice over IP), a talkspurt (a continuous segment of speech between silent intervals), and specified delay and drop-rate requirements for packet services. It was implemented in the Voice Funnel.

Its second version, known variously as ST-II or ST2, was drafted by Claudio Topolcic and others in 1987 and specified in 1990. It was implemented in the Terrestrial Wideband Network and its successor, the Defense Simulation Internet, where it was used extensively for distributed simulations and videoconferencing. This version later formed the core technology for transporting voice calls and other real-time streams within Canada's Iris Digital Communications System.

The final version of ST2, which was also known as ST2+, was drafted by the IETF ST2 Working group and published in 1995 as RFC 1819. ST2 distinguishes its own packets with an Internet Protocol version number 5, although it was never known as IPv5.

ST uses the same IP address structure and the same link layer protocol number (EtherType 0x800) as IP.

In datagram mode, ST packets could be encapsulated with IP headers using protocol number 5.

== Bibliography ==
- Cohen, D., "Specifications for the Network Voice Protocol", Technical Report ISI/RR-75-39, USC/Information Sciences Institute, Marina del Rey, CA (Mar 1976).
- Cohen, D., "A Network Voice Protocol NVP-II" and "Sample NVP/ST Scenarios" (unpublished memorandums), USC/Information Sciences Institute, Marina del Rey, CA (Apr 1981).
- Topolcic, C., Park, P., Draft of "Proposed Changes to the Experimental Internet Stream Protocol (ST)", BBN Laboratories, Cambridge, MA (Apr 1987).
