= PRNET =

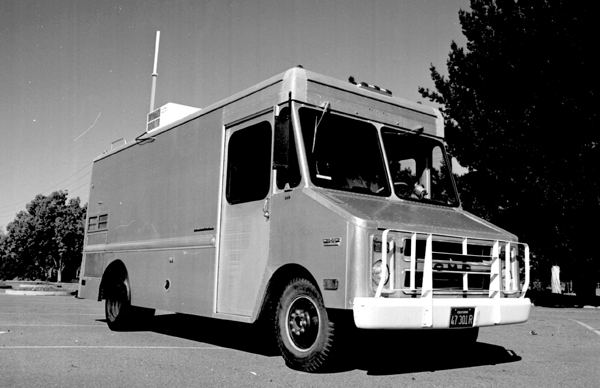
A Stanford Research Institute's Packet Radio Van, site of the first three-way internetworked transmission

The Packet Radio Network (PRNET) was a set of early, experimental mobile ad hoc networks whose technologies evolved over time. It was funded by the Advanced Research Projects Agency (ARPA). Major participants in the project included BBN Technologies, Hazeltine Corporation, Rockwell International's Collins division, and SRI International.

== History ==
ARPA initiated the PRNET project in 1973, funding both theoretical and experimental research. Its goals were outlined in a 1975 paper by Bob Kahn, namely, to investigate the feasibility of using packet-switched, store-and-forward radio communications to provide reliable computer communications in a mobile environment. The earlier ALOHAnet served as an inspiration, but PRNET tackled a significantly harder set of problems, namely, multi-hop communications between mobile vehicles without a central station. In Kahn's initial conception, the overall system design was "predicated upon the existence of an array of low cost repeaters", where he defines the term to mean "a particular kind of packet radio which is equipped to retransmit by radio some or all packets which it receives by radio". In today's terminology, this might be called a router or a packet switch, rather than a radio repeater.

The first PRNET was established under the auspices of SRI in the San Francisco Bay Area, with BBN contributing network technology and Collins creating the Experimental Packet Radios (EPRs), which implemented L-band spread-spectrum waveforms and supported half-duplex communications at 100 or 400 kilobits/second. There was also a smaller network at BBN, for software development and testing. The first packet radios were delivered in mid-1975 for initial testing and a quasi-operational network capability was established for the first time in September 1976, shortly after the prototype networking software was developed. By 1977, this software included radio network routing control; a gateway to other networks; network measurement; debugging tools; and configuration tools.

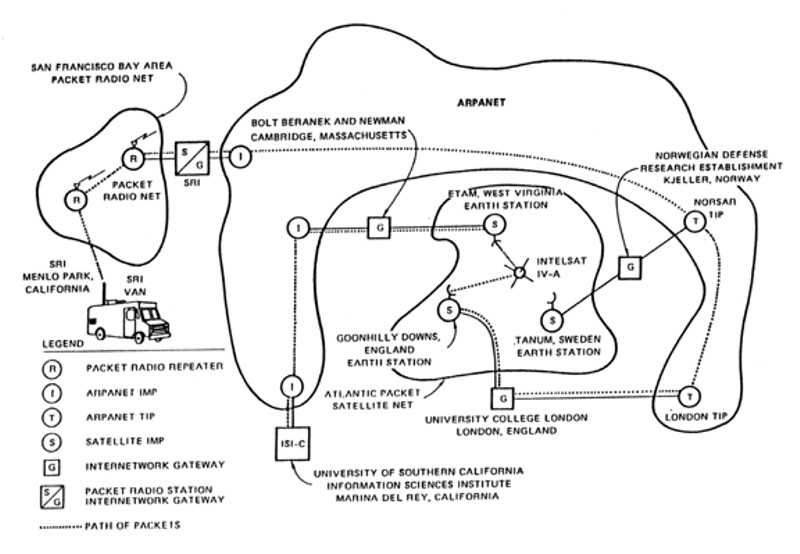
Internetworking demonstration, linking the ARPANET, PRNET, and SATNET on November 22, 1977

PRNET was sufficiently advanced by 1977 to participate in the initial three-way internetworking demonstration, which linked a mobile vehicle in PRNET with nodes in the ARPANET, and via SATNET, to nodes in London run by Peter Kirstein's research group at University College London. Afterwards, it was usually attached to the ARPANET so that BBN software developers could access and update it from Cambridge. By June 1978, about 25 radio nodes were available.

By September 1979, "Ron [Kunzelman] reported that SRI is now operating two PRNETs in the San Francisco bay area, and one PRNET at Ft. Bragg, North Carolina. The net at Ft. Bragg is now eight terminals on two TIUs, and will grow to forty terminals."

The Experimental Packet Radios were later replaced by Upgraded Packet Radios (UPR), circa 1978, and in 1986 by Low-Cost Packet Radio (LPR) as part of DARPA's follow-on SURAN project.

== See also ==
- History of the Internet
