= MILNET =

US military network

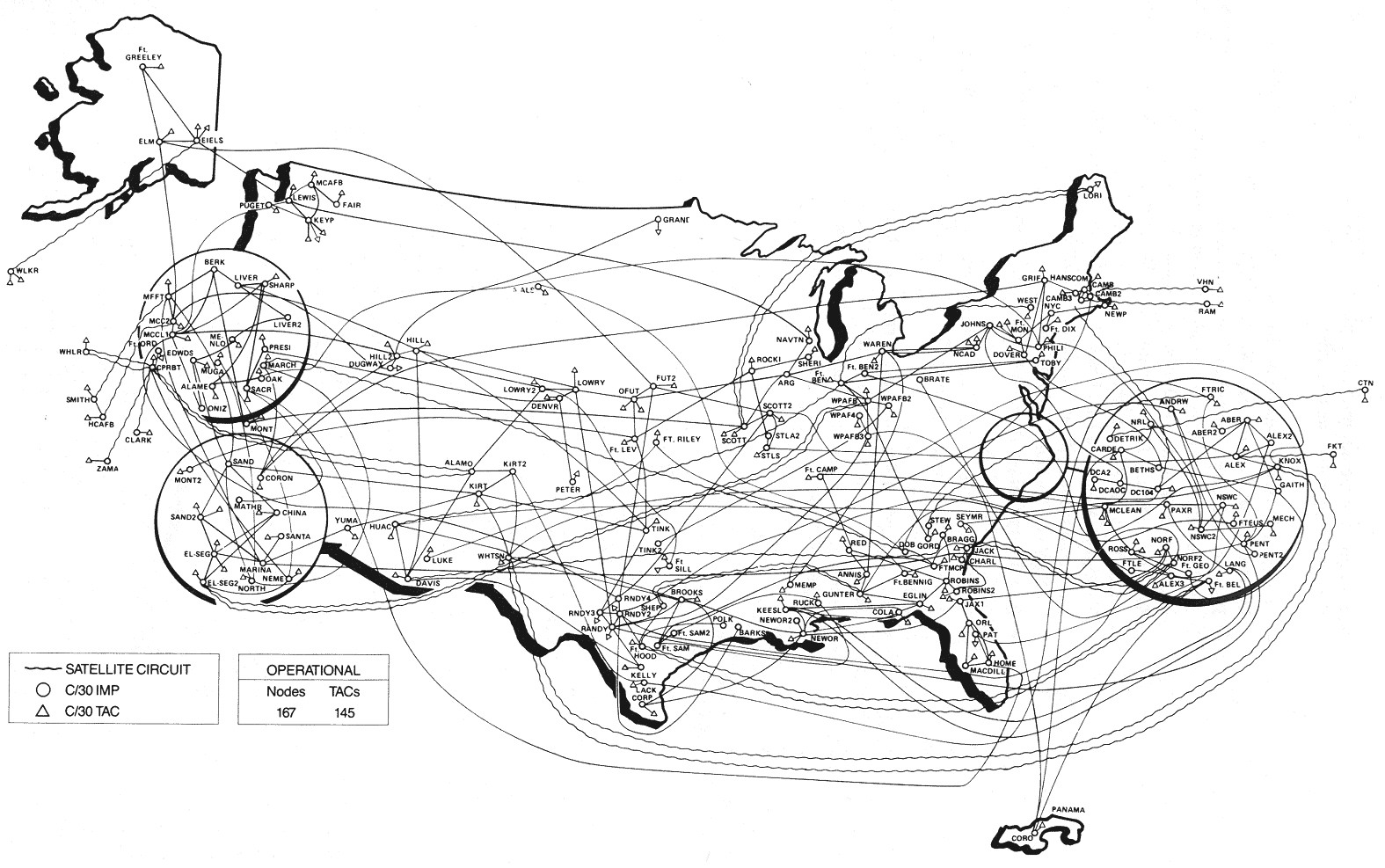
MILNET in the United States, 1989

In computer networking, MILNET (fully Military Network) was the name given to the part of the ARPANET internetwork designated for unclassified United States Department of Defense traffic.

MILNET was physically separated from the ARPANET in 1983. The ARPANET remained in service for the academic research community, but direct connectivity between the networks was severed for security reasons. Gateways relayed electronic mail between the two networks. BBN Technologies built and managed both the MILNET and the ARPANET and the two networks used very similar technology. It is also known as "Military Net."

During the 1980s the MILNET expanded as part of the Defense Data Network, a worldwide set of military networks running at different security levels. In the 1990s, MILNET became the NIPRNET.
