= General Dynamics Mission Systems - Canada =

Aerospace and defense division

General Dynamics Mission Systems-Canada
- Company type: Division
- Industry: Defence and C4ISR
- Predecessor: General Dynamics Canada
- Founded: 1948
- Headquarters: Ottawa, Ontario, Canada
- Area served: Global
- Number of employees: 1,200+
- Parent: General Dynamics
- Website: https://gdmissionsystems.ca

General Dynamics Mission Systems - Canada, formerly Computing Devices Canada, is a technology-based electronic systems, systems integration, and in-service support to defence organizations and public security markets in Canada and abroad. Its parent company is General Dynamics.

== History ==
Computing Devices Canada was incorporated on August 31, 1948 as a global defence contractor. The company was founded by two Polish immigrants to Canada, George Glinski and Joe Norton, to support the rebuilding of Canada's military after the Second World War. The company got its start by manufacturing the Position and Homing Indicator (PHI), a device developed at the National Research Council that kept track of an aircraft's position and indicated its return route to base. One large contract that had a significant influence on the company's growth was for the Kicksorter, a digital-pulse counter designed for the Atomic Energy of Canada Laboratories (AECL) in Chalk River. If the Kicksorter had been slightly modified to do simple arithmetic operations, it would have been a rudimentary computer. AECL purchased a large number of these devices between 1957 and 1963, when they were replaced by one of the early computers in the PDP series manufactured by the Digital Equipment Corporation (DEC). Another contract was to design and construct a large digital simulator for the Royal Canadian Navy that was never completed.

1956 – Active at Ottawa, Canada in Bells Corners; announcing the part-acquisition of CDC by Bendix Aviation Corp., through its Canadian subsidiary Bendix-Eclipse of Canada Ltd. (“Valley Kid”; “New Agreement Widens Scope of CDC Activities”)

CDC designed and produced the ANTAC, an analogue computer navigation system showing precise position. It was used on the CL-28 Argus from 1958 as well as on the later Nimrod. It projected aircraft position onto the tactical navigators map table, allowing him to keep a graphic log of position, sonobouy drops and reported contacts.

CDC developed and provided the AN/ASN-99 Projected Map Display (PMD) for the A-7 Corsair II produced from 1967. This was a more modern avionics system than was in contemporary aircraft. A notable and advanced equipment, it was a projected map display located just below the radar scope. The map display was slaved to the inertial navigation system and provided a high-resolution map image of the aircraft's position superimposed over TPC/JNC charts.

In 1969 Control Data Corporation acquired Computing Devices Canada.

General Dynamics Sonobuoy Processors have provided front line service with allied nations for nearly 50 years. Its UYS-505 family of acoustic processors offers world beating detection performance, and modern operator tools in an off the shelf package.

CDC designed the world's first digital fire control system to aim the main gun of main battle tanks. After demonstrating it to the US Army at its Aberdeen Proving Ground, the Army was so impressed that it directed Chrysler Defense (now General Dynamics Land Systems) to incorporate it into the Abrams M1 Main Battle Tank. This allowed the Abrams M1 to fire accurately while on the move. Developed versions are also used in other main battle tanks.

During the 1990s, Computing Devices Canada implemented the Iris Digital Communications System, which was a thorough communications upgrade for the Canadian Army, and on the strength of that effort, was awarded the Bowman contract to perform a similar effort for the British Army.

In 1998, General Dynamics purchased the company, renaming it to General Dynamics Canada.

== Products and programs ==
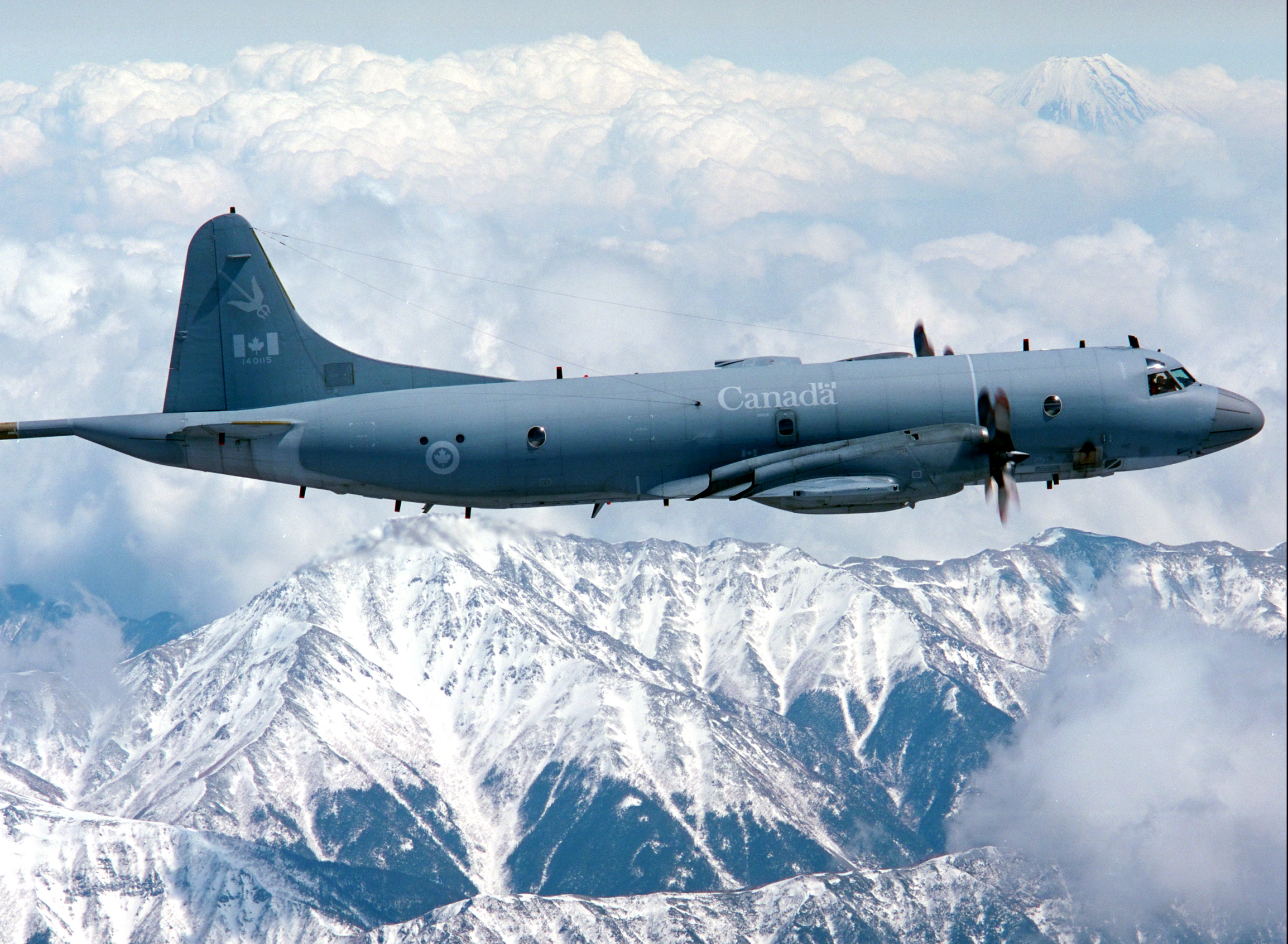
December 2006 - A CP-140 Aurora aircraft flies by Mount Rainier in the State of Washington, USA.

The Aurora Program is the mid-life upgrade of the CP140 Aurora aircraft operated by the Canadian Department of National Defence as a long-range maritime patrol platform for surface and undersea surveillance roles. GD Mission Systems — Canada has been contracted to develop the Data Management System (DMS) and Acoustic Suite subsystems. The latest release brings with it new capabilities in terms of Link 16, BLOS-WGS satcom and self-defence in the form of a Directed IR Countermeasures system (DIRCM).

In 2014, they were awarded two contracts on the Mercury Global Project. The first contract is for the design-and-build of a network of Mercury Global anchor stations valued at $59.1 million. Through this network of antennas, the Department of National Defence will access the Wideband Global Satellite (WGS) constellation and will be able to provide secure communications for deployed Canadian Forces. The second contract provides ongoing in-service support and is valued at $8.5 million.

== Sources ==
- NAVAIR 01-45AAE-1, A-7C/E Flight Manual. Washington, D.C., USA: US Navy. 1 March 1973.
