= Iris Digital Communications System =

Canadian tactical communication system

The Iris Digital Communications System, also known as the Tactical Command, Control, and Communications System (TCCCS), is a tactical communication system used by the Canadian Army. It was a pioneering system that integrated voice and data communications via the Internet Protocol and ST-II protocol. Elements of the Iris system, together with the High-capacity data radio, later formed the foundation of the British Army's Bowman communications system.

The Iris system was originally conceived in the early 1970s, with a contract signed to Computing Devices Canada (now General Dynamics) as system integrator in April 1991. The complete Iris system was delivered to the Department of National Defence in November 2003, for a total cost of $2 billion Canadian.

Iris is an integrated voice and data distribution system that provides secure and survivable communications. It provides end-to-end services across a variety of tactical radios, telephones, computers, and fiber-optic, wireless, and satellite networks. All told, the Iris system integrates more than 200 types of equipment, including 15,000 radios, 1,500 data terminals, and three major software applications. Its components are installed in approximately 5,000 armored and soft-skinned vehicles.

Major Iris subsystems are as follows:

- Combat Net Radios (CNR) - a full range of tactical radios supporting voice and data communications in the HF, VHF, and UHF bands, including combat net radios, point-to-point, ship-to-shore, air-ground-air, and long range radios. This radio equipment can be deployed in vehicles, ships, or manpack configurations.
- Information Distribution System (IDS) - the heart of the Iris System, as it integrates all the components into a unified tactical command, control, and communications network. It serves users at all levels of command in a variety of vehicle configurations, including formation headquarters, tactical command posts, certain armored vehicles, and other selected command vehicles. Its network routers were designed and implemented by BBN Technologies under subcontract to Computing Devices Canada.
- Iris Trunk System (ITS) - extends the range of tactical communications to strategic, allied, or commercial networks. It operates over fibre optic cables and UHF and SHF Line-of-Sight Radio Relays.
- Long Range Communications System (LRCS) - provides extended range communications to commanders in the field via satellite and HF facilities
- Iris System Management (ISM) - supports communication management functions, with subsystems including the Communication Management System, Cryptographic Material Management System, and IDS Network Management System.
- Tactical Message Handling System (TMHS) - e-mail and messaging services, with a store and forward capability for mobile users.
