= IEEE Corporate Innovation Recognition =

Award by the IEEE

IEEE Corporate Innovation Award
- Awarded for: An outstanding and exemplary innovation by an industrial entity, governmental or academic organization, or other corporate body, within the fields of interest to the IEEE.
- Presented by: Institute of Electrical and Electronics Engineers
- First award: 1952
- Website: IEEE Corporate Innovation Award

The IEEE Corporate Innovation Recognition was established by the IEEE Board of Directors in 1985. This award is presented for outstanding and exemplary contributions by an industrial entity, governmental, or academic organization, or other corporate body.

Recipients of this award will receive a certificate and crystal sculpture.

== Recipients ==
- 2021: TSMC
- 2020: Apple
- 2019: Bose Corporation
- 2018: Pixar Animation Studios
- 2017: Analog Devices
- 2016: Intel Corporation
- 2015: Sandisk Corporation
- 2014: DARPA
- 2013: Applied Materials
- 2012: Sanyo
- 2011: IMEC
- 2010: Samsung
- 2009: IBM T.J. Watson Research Center
- 2009: Corning
- 2008: Research in Motion
- 2007: Texas Instruments, DLP Products
- 2007: Toyota
- 2006: Arm Holdings
- 2005: NTT Docomo
- 2005: AMD
- 2004: Hewlett-Packard Company
- 2004: QUALCOMM
- 2003: Xerox Corporation
- 2003: Titan Corporation
- 2002: Taiwan Semiconductor Manufacturing
- 2002: Seiko Epson
- 2002: Cadence Design Systems
- 2001: No Award
- 2000: Sun Microsystems
- 2000: Lucent
- 1999: Nokia
- 1999: BBN Technologies
- 1998: Microsoft
- 1997: Motorola
- 1996: Texas Instruments, Digital Signal Processing Group
- 1995: IBM
- 1994: Bellcore
- 1993: Jet Propulsion Laboratory
- 1992: Ericsson Radio Systems AB Philips Electronics
- 1991: Apple
- 1990: IBM
- 1989: Hewlett-Packard
- 1988: AT&T Bell Laboratories
- 1987: Sony, IBM
- 1986: Intel
