= SURAN =

The Survivable Radio Network (SURAN) project was sponsored by DARPA in the 1980s to develop a set of mobile ad hoc network (MANET) radio-routers, then known as "packet radios". It was a follow-on to DARPA's earlier PRNET project. The program began in 1983 with the following goals:

- develop a small, low-cost, low-power radio that would support more sophisticated packet radio protocols than the DARPA Packet Radio project from the 1970s
- develop and demonstrate algorithms that could scale to tens of thousands of nodes
- develop and demonstrate techniques for robust and survivable packet networking in sophisticated electronic attacks.

A follow-on program in 1987, the Low-cost Packet Radio (LPR), attempted further innovations in mobile networking protocols, with design goals including:

- management of radio spreading codes for security, and increasing capacity
- new queue management and forwarding techniques for spread spectrum channels
- scalability based on dynamic clustering

BBN Technologies provided the MANET protocols, and Rockwell provided radio hardware. The prototype radios produced in these programs were known as VRC-99 radios, and were used by the Department of Defense throughout the 1990s for experimentation.

== See also ==
- Survivable Low Frequency Communications System
