= Voice Funnel =

1980s network interface for digitized speech

The Voice Funnel was an experimental high-speed interface between digitized speech streams and a packet switching communications network, in particular the ARPANET. It was built in the time frame from 1979 to 1981. It may be viewed as an early Voice over IP voice and video telephone.

The Voice Funnel was designed and built by Bolt, Beranek and Newman. During the 1980s, it was used for audio and video conferences across the ARPANET, and later evolved into the multi-processor BBN Butterfly computer.

== See also ==
- Network Voice Protocol
