= Wireless Network after Next =

Wireless Network after Next brochure, DARPA, September 2010

The Wireless Network after Next (WNaN) was a DARPA project to create and demonstrate an advanced tactical mobile ad-hoc network (MANET) that rapidly adapts to soldiers maneuvering in complicated environments, automatically determining the best radio frequencies and network paths to maximize connectivity and throughput. In 2010 it was successfully demonstrated in live military experiments containing up to 100 nodes, the largest military MANET demonstrated to that date.

The Wireless Network after Next consisted of a novel radio platform, created by Cobham plc, and novel networking protocols, created by BBN Technologies:

- The WNaN radio was envisioned as a low-cost, hand-held, multi-channel, spectrum-agile, MIMO-capable wireless node, built with inexpensive RF circuit technology. It operated in the 900 MHz to 6 GHz frequency band, and contained multiple radio transceivers for simultaneous transmission and reception across multiple frequency bands at rates greater than 1 megabit/second.
- The WNaN network provided highly adaptive communications in a self-organizing, self-healing network. Each radio node acted as a router to automatically perform dynamic spectrum management for spectrum agility, Disruption Tolerant Networking for resilience, and content-based networking for efficient data dissemination. The routers also took full advantage of sending and receiving communications packets in parallel across multiple radio transceivers.
