= Terrestrial Wideband Network =

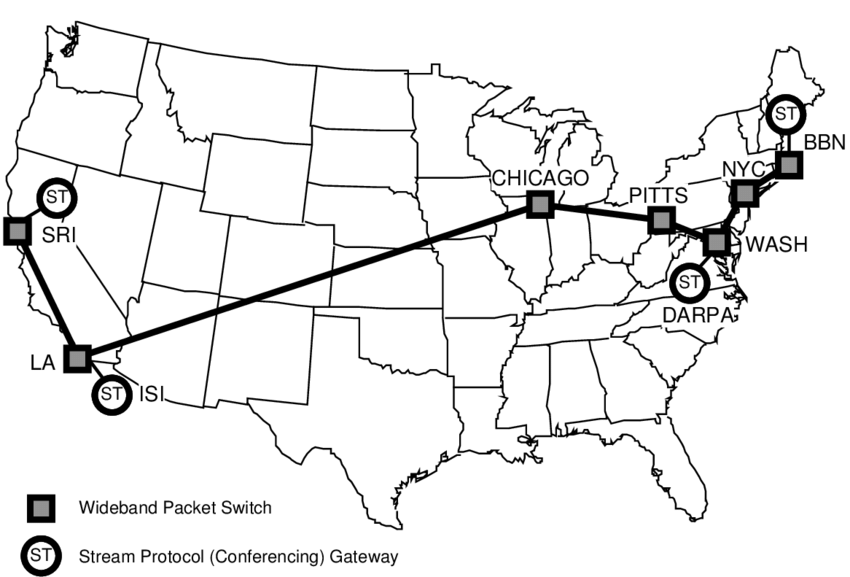
Terrestrial Wideband Network

The Terrestrial Wideband Network was a DARPA-sponsored experimental network designed to support research in high-speed networking protocols and distributed multimedia applications. It was built and operated by BBN Technologies from May 1989 to about 1991; although originally planned to turn into the Defense Research Internet, it instead evolved into the Defense Simulation Internet.

The Terrestrial Wideband Network was a trans-continental network implemented via Wideband Packet Switches (based on BBN Butterfly parallel computers) connected by T1 circuits. It replaced the 3 megabit/second Satellite Wideband Network, which had been in operation for the previous 8 years. Because it was based on a single cross-country T1 trunk from the DARPA National Networking Testbed (NNT), the Terrestrial Wideband Network's topology was linear, i.e., a series of packet switches connected in a line by T1 trunks. Each T1 link ran at 1.544 megabits per second.

The Terrestrial Wideband Network provided standard Internet Protocol transport, but also multicast services and the experimental, connection-oriented Internet Stream Protocol (ST-II). Individual host computers could gain access to ST-II features via the Host Access Protocol (HAP), specified in RFC 907-A. Internally, the network was based on the Dual Bus Protocol (DBP), a descendant of the QPSX protocol proposed as the IEEE 802.6 Metropolitan Area Network (MAN) standard, enhanced to provide bandwidth reservations with access fairness, and to operate over long distances.
