= Transformational Satellite Communications System =

The Transformational Satellite Communications System (TSAT) program was a United States Department of Defense (DOD) program sponsored by the U.S. Air Force for a secure, high-capacity global communications network serving the Department of Defense, NASA and the United States Intelligence Community (IC). It was intended as an enabler of net-centric warfare that would facilitate defense and intelligence professionals making rapid decisions based on integrated, comprehensive information. In 2003, the estimated project costs for the period up to 2015 were estimated to US$ 12 billion (inflation adjusted US$ 21 billion in 2025). In October 2008, the DoD announced that it was postponing making a decision on choosing a contractor to build the system until 2010. In April 2009 Secretary of Defence Robert M. Gates asked that the project be canceled in its entirety.

== Scope ==
The Transformational Satellite Communications System (TSAT) aimed to provide the Department of Defense (DoD) with high data rate Military Satellite Communications (MILSATCOM) and Internet-like services as defined in the Transformational Communications Architecture (TCA). TSAT would have supported global net-centric operations. As the spaceborne element of the Global Information Grid (GIG), TSAT would extend the GIG to users without terrestrial connections providing improved connectivity and data transfer capability, vastly improving satellite communications for the warfighter. TSAT's Internet Protocol (IP) routing would connect thousands of users through networks rather than limited point-to-point connections. TSAT would have enabled high data rate connections to Space and Airborne Intelligence, Surveillance, and Reconnaissance (SISR, AISR) platforms.

== Capabilities and services ==
The TSAT program was planned as a five satellite constellation (a sixth satellite was planned as a spare to ensure mission availability), TSAT satellite operations centers (TSOC) for on-orbit control, TSAT Mission Operations Systems (TMOS) to provide network management, and ground gateways. The TMOS single contract was awarded in January 2006.

TSAT planned radio frequency (RF) and laser communications links to meet defense and intelligence community requirements for high data rate, protected communications. The space segment aimed to make use of key technology advancements that have proven mature by independent testing of integrated subsystem brassboards to achieve a transformational leap in SATCOM capabilities. These technologies include but are not limited to: single and multi-access laser communications (to include wide field-of-view technology), Internet protocol based packet switching, bulk and packet encryption/decryption, battle command-on-the-move antennas, dynamic bandwidth and resource allocation techniques, and protected bandwidth efficient modulation.

== Chronology ==
An Interim Program Review was held 22 October 2004; the Milestone Decision Authority (MDA) directed the TSAT program to continue as planned to achieve the delivery, launch, and on-orbit checkout of the first TSAT satellite.

In June 2003, the acquisition strategy for TSAT was approved, as stated in the FY05 PB justification.

On 20 January 2004, the TSAT program entered Phase B, Risk Reduction and Design Development. Phase B space segment contracts (Cost Plus, Fixed Fee) were awarded to Lockheed Martin and Boeing in late Jan 04. A $300M FY05 Congressional reduction resulted in a first launch delay from FY12 to FY13. In response to the Congressional reduction, the Air Force adjusted the FY06/07 budget.

On January 27, 2006 TSAT Mission Operations System (TMOS) segment development contract, worth US$2+ Billion was awarded to Lockheed Martin.

In July 2007, Lockheed Martin and Northrop Grumman announced a plan to develop an IPv6-based networking system with Juniper Networks for the TSAT project. Boeing also engaged in development related to the program.

The results of the competition to select the final space segment development contractor were originally to be announced in October 2007. However, the Air Force deferred this announcement until second-quarter 2008.

FY07 aimed to verify with subsystem hardware testing in a space-like environment, that technologies are mature. If a technology fails to mature, less-capable technology off-ramps exist and can be used to preserve schedule. Even the technology off-ramps will significantly enhance warfighter capabilities, and the advanced technology can be 'spiraled' into a later spacecraft. First launch was scheduled for 2QFY13.

In October 2008, the DoD announced that it was deferring until 2010 a decision on choosing a contractor to build the system. The DoD did not announce whether it would continue to fund further development of the system in the interim.

In December 2008, the US Air Force released a new request for proposal (RFP) to Lockheed Martin and Boeing. The new proposal calls for five satellites and ground stations providing message and data routing for US Army units, including vehicles in the new Future Combat Systems, with the launch of the first satellite projected for 2019. The RFP requests that the new system use the specifications developed under the less-costly, designed backup system.

== Program termination ==
On 6 April 2009, U.S. Secretary of Defense Gates announced the department's recommendations for the FY2010 budget. Among these recommendations was the plan to cancel the TSAT program. High cost, technological risk, and development delays were given as primary reasons, though some have argued that funding instability within the DoD was a primary cause of the protracted development timeline. As an interim replacement strategy, Secretary Gates recommended the fielding of two additional AEHF satellites.

== See also ==
- Department of Defense Architecture Framework
- DoD Joint Technical Framework version 6.0
- DoD Business Enterprise Architecture
- Global Information Grid-Enterprise Services initiative
- Department Of Defense Directive (DoDD) 8100.01 "Global Information Grid - Overarching Policy", September 2002
- JTF-Global Network Operations
- Global Information Grid
