= Defense Simulation Internet =

Defense Simulation Internet, 1994

The Defense Simulation Internet (DSI) was a specialized, wide-area network created to support Distributed Interactive Simulation and videoconferences. It was sponsored by DARPA, and built and operated by BBN Technologies from about 1991-1995, after which time it was operated by the Defense Information Systems Agency (DISA).

The DSI evolved from DARPA's earlier Terrestrial Wideband Network, which could provide the realtime multicast with bandwidth guarantees that are essential to distributed interactive simulations via the Internet Stream Protocol (ST-II). A Defense Science Board study in 1993 highlighted the importance of these capabilities in simulations, and by late 1994, the DSI connected about 100 local area networks at sites around the world. Many links operated at multiple T1 circuits, for an aggregate bandwidth of about 6 megabits/second. In 1994, DSI program management transitioned to a joint program office of DARPA and DISA, and after the network became fully operational in February 1995, DARPA handed off all management responsibility to DISA.

Phase I of the DSI was implemented by BBN T/20 routers running the Internet Stream Protocol. Phase II, completed in October 1997, was a reimplementation using Cisco 7500 routers running the Resource Reservation Protocol (RSVP) over ATM permanent virtual circuits. The Phase II topology was a mesh of 7 backbone nodes, with 46 tail circuits running to the other DSI sites as of April 1998. (See D. Sahu for a Phase II network map and extensive details.)
