= High-capacity data radio =

High-capacity data radio (HCDR) is a development of the Near-Term Digital Radio (NTDR) for the UK government as a part of the Bowman communication system. It is a secure wideband 225–450 MHz UHF radio system that provides a self-managing IP-based Internet backbone capability without the need for other infrastructure communications (mobile phone, fixed communications).

There is also an export version that incorporates Advanced Encryption Standard (AES) encryption rather than UK Government Type 1 Crypto. The radio offers a link throughput (terminal to terminal) of 500 kbit/s. A deployment of over 200 HCDR-equipped military vehicles can automatically configure and self manage into a fully connected autonomous mesh network intercommunicating using mobile ad hoc network (MANET) protocols. The radio is an IPv4-compliant three-port router having a radio port, Ethernet port and PPP serial port. The 20-watt radio has adaptive transmit power and adaptive forward error correction and can optimally achieve ground ranges up to 15 km with omnidirectional antennas. A maritime version allows radio LAN operation within flotillas of naval ships up to 20 km apart. The radio features coded modulation with internal wide-band or narrow band radio data modems.
