= NPL network =

Historical network in England pioneering packet switching

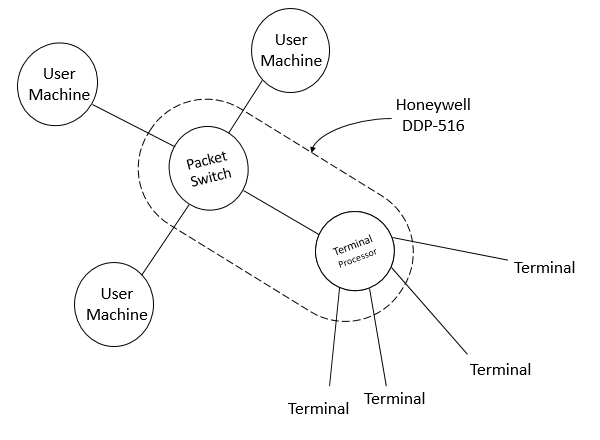
NPL network schematic

The NPL network, or NPL Data Communications Network, was a local area computer network operated by the National Physical Laboratory (NPL) in London that pioneered the concept of packet switching.

Based on designs conceived by Donald Davies in 1965, development work began in 1966. Construction began in 1968 and elements of the first version of the network, the Mark I, became operational in early 1969 then fully operational in January 1970. The Mark II version operated from 1973 until 1986. The NPL network was the first computer network to implement packet switching and the first to use high-speed links. Its original design, along with the innovations implemented in the ARPANET and the CYCLADES network, laid down the technical foundations of the modern Internet.

== Origins ==
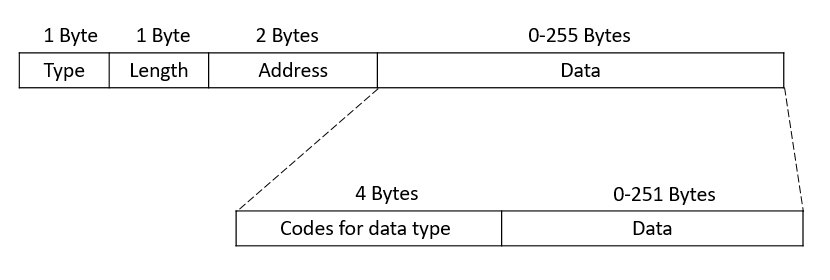
NPL network packet

In 1965, Donald Davies, who was later appointed to head of the NPL Division of Computer Science, proposed a commercial national data network in the United Kingdom based on packet switching in Proposal for the Development of a National Communications Service for On-line Data Processing. The following year, he refined his ideas in Proposal for the Development of a National Communications Service for OnLine Data Processing. The design was the first to describe the concept of an "interface computer", today known as a router.

A written version of the proposal entitled A digital communications network for computers giving rapid response at remote terminals was presented by Roger Scantlebury at the Symposium on Operating Systems Principles in 1967. The design involved transmitting signals (packets) across a network with a hierarchical structure. It was proposed that "local networks" be constructed with interface computers which had responsibility for multiplexing among a number of user systems (time-sharing computers and other users) and for communicating with "high level network". The latter would be constructed with "switching nodes" connected together with megabit rate circuits (T1 links, which run with a 1.544 Mbit/s line rate). In Scantlebury's report following the conference, he noted "It would appear that the ideas in the NPL paper at the moment are more advanced than any proposed in the USA".

=== Packet switching ===
The first theoretical foundation of packet switching was the work of Paul Baran, at RAND, in which data was transmitted in small chunks and routed independently by a method similar to store-and-forward techniques between intermediate networking nodes. Davies independently arrived at the same model in 1965 and named it packet switching. He chose the term "packet" after consulting with an NPL linguist because it was capable of being translated into languages other than English without compromise. In July 1968, NPL put on a demonstration of real and simulated networks at an event organised by the Real Time Club at the Royal Festival Hall in London. Davies gave the first public presentation of packet switching on 5 August 1968 at the IFIP Congress in Edinburgh.

Davies' original ideas influenced other research around the world. Larry Roberts incorporated these concepts into the design for the ARPANET. The NPL network initially proposed a line speed of 768 kbit/s. Influenced by this, the planned line speed for ARPANET was upgraded from 2.4 kbit/s to 50 kbit/s and a similar packet format adopted. Louis Pouzin's CYCLADES project in France was also influenced by Davies' work. These networks laid down the technical foundations of the modern Internet.

== Implementation ==
=== Network development ===
Beginning in late 1966, Davies' tasked Derek Barber, his deputy, to establish a team to build a local-area network to serve the needs of NPL and prove the feasibility of packet switching. The team consisted of:

- Data communications and team leader: Roger Scantlebury
- Software: Peter Wilkinson (lead), John Laws, Carol Walsh, Keith Wilkinson (no relation) and Rex Haymes.
- Hardware: Keith Bartlett (lead), Les Pink, Patrick Woodroffe, Brian Aldous, Peter Carter, Peter Neale and a few others.

The team worked through 1967 to produce design concepts for a wide-area network and a local-area network to demonstrate the technology. Construction of the local-area network began in 1968 using a Honeywell 516 node. The NPL team liaised with Honeywell in the adaptation of the DDP516 input/output controller, and, the following year, the ARPANET chose the same computer to serve as Interface Message Processors (IMPs).

Elements of the first version of the network, Mark I NPL Network, became operational in early 1969 (before the ARPANET installed its first node). The network was fully operational in January 1970. The local-area NPL network followed by the wide-area ARPANET in the United States were the first two computer networks that implemented packet switching. The network used high-speed links, the first computer network to do so.

The NPL network was later interconnected with other networks, including the Post Office Experimental Packet Switched Service (EPSS) and the European Informatics Network (EIN) in 1976.

In 1976, 12 computers and 75 terminal devices were attached. The following year there were roughly 30 computers, 30 peripherals and 100 VDU terminals all able to interact through the NPL Network. The network remained in operation until 1986.

=== Protocol development ===
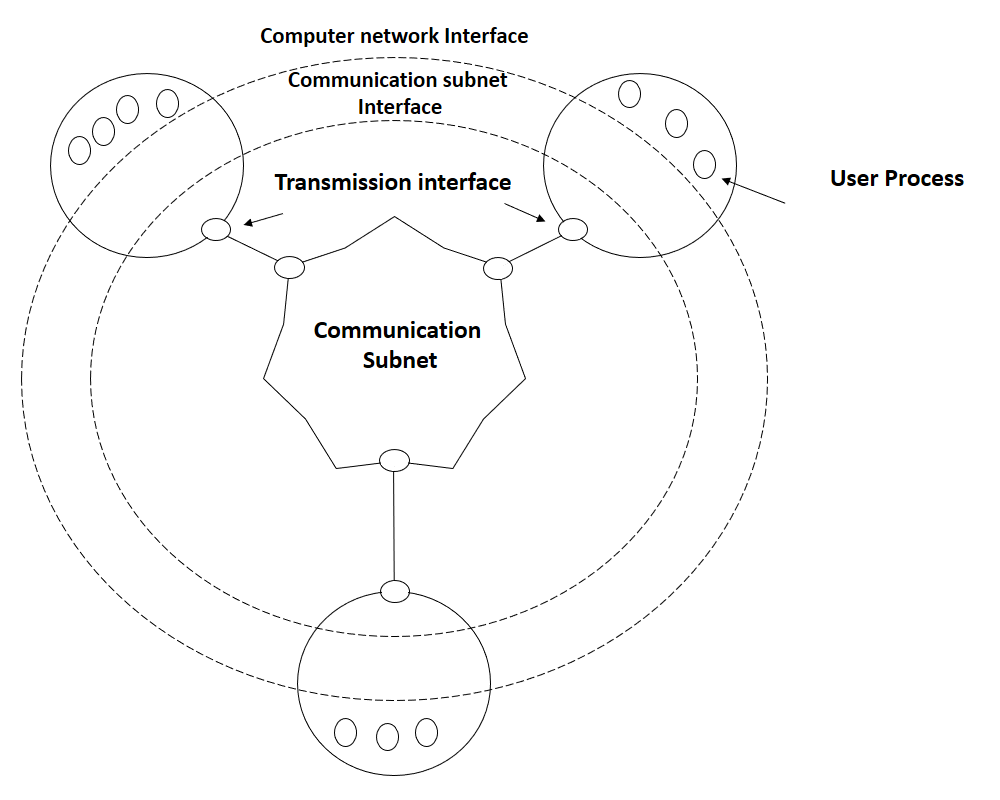
NPL network model

The first use of the term protocol in a modern data-commutations context occurs in a memorandum entitled A Protocol for Use in the NPL Data Communications Network written by Roger Scantlebury and Keith Bartlett in April 1967. A further publication by Bartlett in 1968 introduced the concept of an alternating bit protocol (later used by the ARPANET and the EIN) and described the need for three levels of data transmission, roughly corresponding to the lower levels of the seven-layer OSI model that emerged a decade later.

The Mark II version, which operated from 1973, used such a "layered" protocol architecture.

The NPL team also introduced the idea of protocol verification. Protocol verification was discussed in the November 1978 special edition of the Proceedings of the IEEE on packet switching.

== Further research ==
=== Simulation studies ===
The NPL team also carried out simulation work on the performance of wide-area packet networks, studying datagrams and network congestion. This work was carried out to investigate networks of a size capable of providing data communications facilities to most of the U.K.

Davies proposed an adaptive method of congestion control that he called isarithmic.

=== Internetworking ===
The NPL network was a testbed for internetworking research throughout the 1970s. Davies, Scantlebury and Barber were active members of the International Network Working Group (INWG) formed in 1972. Vint Cerf and Bob Kahn acknowledged Davies and Scantlebury in their 1974 paper A Protocol for Packet Network Intercommunication, which DARPA developed into the Internet protocol suite used in the modern Internet.

Barber was appointed director of the European COST 11 project and played a leading part in the European Informatics Network (EIN). Scantlebury led the UK technical contribution, reporting directly to Donald Davies. The EIN protocol helped to launch the INWG and X.25 protocols. INWG proposed an international end to end protocol in 1975/6, although this was not widely adopted. Barber became the chair of INWG in 1976. He proposed and implemented a mail protocol for EIN.

NPL investigated the "basic dilemma" involved in internetworking; that is, a common host protocol would require restructuring existing networks if they were not designed to use the same protocol. NPL connected with the European Informatics Network by translating between two different host protocols while the NPL connection to the Post Office Experimental Packet Switched Service used a common host protocol in both networks. This work confirmed establishing a common host protocol would be more reliable and efficient.

Davies and Barber published Communication networks for computers in 1973 and Computer networks and their protocols in 1979. They spoke at the Data Communications Symposium in 1975 about the "battle for access standards" between datagrams and virtual circuits, with Barber saying the "lack of standard access interfaces for emerging public packet-switched communication networks is creating 'some kind of monster' for users". For a long period of time, the network engineering community was polarized over the implementation of competing protocol suites, commonly known as the Protocol Wars. It was unclear which type of protocol would result in the best and most robust computer networks.

Derek Barber was involved in Internet design discussions in 1980.

=== Email ===
Derek Barber proposed a network mail protocol and implemented it on the EIN in 1979, the first European protocol for electronic mail. (Note: UCL implemented network mail on its connection to the ARPANET in 1974.) Jon Postel referenced Barber's work in his first paper on Internet email, published in the Internet Experiment Note series.

=== Network security ===
Davies' later research at NPL focused on data security for computer networks.

== Legacy ==
The concepts of packet switching, high-speed routers, layered communication protocols, hierarchical computer networks, and the essence of the end-to-end principle that were researched and developed at the NPL became fundamental to data communication in modern computer networks including the Internet.

Beyond NPL, and the designs of Paul Baran at RAND, DARPA was the most important institutional force, creating the ARPANET, the first wide-area packet-switched network, to which many other network designs at the time were compared or replicated. The ARPANET's routing, flow control, software design and network control were developed independently by the IMP team working for Bolt Beranek & Newman. The CYCLADES network designed by Louis Pouzin at the IRIA in France built on the work of Donald Davies and pioneered important improvements to the ARPANET design.

Moreover, in the view of some, the research and development of internetworking, and TCP/IP in particular (which was sponsored by DARPA), marks the true beginnings of the Internet. The adoption of TCP/IP and the early governance of the Internet were also fostered by DARPA.

NPL sponsors a gallery, opened in 2009, about the "Technology of the Internet" at The National Museum of Computing at Bletchley Park.

== See also ==
- Coloured Book protocols
- History of the Internet
- Internet in the United Kingdom
- JANET
- UK Post Office Telecommunications and later British Telecommunications
  - Packet Switch Stream
  - International Packet Switched Service
- Telecommunications in the United Kingdom

== Sources ==
- Abbate, Janet (1999). Inventing the Internet. Cambridge, Massachusetts: MIT Press. ISBN 978-0-262-01172-3.
