= End-to-end principle =

Design principle for computer networking

The end-to-end (E2E) principle is a design principle in computer networking that requires application-specific features (such as reliability and security) to be implemented in the communicating end nodes of the network, instead of in the network itself. Intermediary nodes (such as gateways and routers) that exist to establish the network may still implement these features to improve efficiency but do not guarantee end-to-end functionality.

The essence of what would later be called the end-to-end principle was contained in the work of Donald Davies on packet-switched networks in the 1960s. Louis Pouzin pioneered the use of the end-to-end strategy in the CYCLADES network in the 1970s. The principle was first articulated explicitly in 1981 by Saltzer, Reed, and Clark. (Note: The 1981 paper was published in ACM's TOCS in an updated version in 1984.) The meaning of the end-to-end principle has been continuously reinterpreted ever since its initial articulation. Noteworthy formulations of the end-to-end principle can be found before the seminal 1981 Saltzer, Reed, and Clark paper.

A basic premise of the principle is that the payoffs from adding certain features required by the end application to the communication subsystem quickly diminish. The end hosts have to implement these functions for correctness. (Note: The full quote from the Saltzer, Reed, Clark paper states: "In a system that includes communications, one usually draws a modular boundary around the communication subsystem and defines a firm interface between it and the rest of the system. When doing so, it becomes apparent that there is a list of functions each of which might be implemented in any of several ways: by the communication subsystem, by its client, as a joint venture, or perhaps redundantly, each doing its own version. In reasoning about this choice, the requirements of the application provide the basis for the following class of arguments: The function in question can completely and correctly be implemented only with the knowledge and help of the application standing at the endpoints of the communication system. Therefore, providing that questioned function as a feature of the communication system itself is not possible, and moreover, produces a performance penalty for all clients of the communication system. (Sometimes an incomplete version of the function provided by the communication system may be useful as a performance enhancement.) We call this line of reasoning against low-level function implementation the end-to-end argument." (p. 278).) Implementing a specific function incurs some resource penalties regardless of whether the function is used or not, and implementing a specific function in the network adds these penalties to all clients, whether they need the function or not.

== Concept ==
According to the end-to-end principle, the network is only responsible for providing the terminals with best-effort connections. Features such as reliability and security must be provided by mechanisms and protocols located at the terminals.

The fundamental notion behind the end-to-end principle is that for two processes communicating with each other via some communication means, the reliability obtained from that means cannot be expected to be perfectly aligned with the reliability requirements of the processes. In particular, meeting or exceeding very high-reliability requirements of communicating processes separated by networks of nontrivial size is more costly than obtaining the required degree of reliability by positive end-to-end acknowledgments and retransmissions (referred to as PAR or ARQ). (Note: In fact, even in local area networks there is a non-zero probability of communication failure – "attention to reliability at higher levels is required regardless of the control strategy of the network".) Put differently, it is far easier to obtain reliability beyond a certain margin by mechanisms in the end hosts of a network rather than in the intermediary nodes, (Note: Put in economics terms, the marginal cost of additional reliability in the network exceeds the marginal cost of obtaining the same additional reliability by measures in the end hosts. The economically efficient level of reliability improvement inside the network depends on the specific circumstances; however, it is certainly nowhere near zero: "Clearly, some effort at the lower levels to improve network reliability can have a significant effect on application performance. (p. 281).") especially when the latter are beyond the control of, and not accountable to, the former. (Note: The possibility of enforceable contractual remedies notwithstanding, it is impossible for any network in which intermediary resources are shared in a non-deterministic fashion to guarantee perfect reliability. At most, it may quote statistical performance averages.) Positive end-to-end acknowledgments with infinite retries can obtain arbitrarily high reliability from any network with a higher than zero probability of successfully transmitting data from one end to another. (Note: More precisely: "THM 1: A correctly functioning PAR protocol with infinite retry count never fails to deliver, loses, or duplicates messages. COR 1A: A correctly functioning PAR protocol with finite retry count never loses or duplicates messages, and the probability of failing to deliver a message can be made arbitrarily small by the sender." (p. 3).)

The end-to-end principle does not extend to functions beyond end-to-end error control and correction, and security. E.g., no straightforward end-to-end arguments can be made for communication parameters such as latency and throughput. In a 2001 paper, Blumenthal and Clark note: "[F]rom the beginning, the end-to-end arguments revolved around requirements that could be implemented correctly at the endpoints; if implementation inside the network is the only way to accomplish the requirement, then an end-to-end argument isn't appropriate in the first place."

The end-to-end principle is closely related, and sometimes seen as a direct precursor, to the principle of net neutrality.

== History ==
In the 1960s, Paul Baran and Donald Davies, in their pre-ARPANET elaborations of networking, made comments about reliability. Baran introduced the concept of virtual circuits in 1962. His report in 1964 states: "Reliability and raw error rates are secondary. The network must be built with the expectation of heavy damage anyway. Powerful error removal methods exist."

Davies was against the concept of virtual circuits. He captured the essence of the end-to-end principle in his 1967 paper, which stated that users of the network will provide themselves with error control: "It is thought that all users of the network will provide themselves with some kind of error control and that without difficulty this could be made to show up a missing packet. Because of this, loss of packets, if it is sufficiently rare, can be tolerated." Davies built the local-area NPL network with a single packet switch and worked on the simulation of wide-area networks.

The ARPANET was the first large-scale general-purpose packet switching network – implementing several of the concepts previously articulated by Baran and Davies. The design, led by Bob Kahn, was based on reliable virtual circuits. The BBN "IMP Guys" developed the routing algorithm, flow control, software design, and network control.

Building on these ideas, Louis Pouzin, with Hubert Zimmermann and others, developed the CYCLADES network. This was the first wide-area network to implement datagrams and make the hosts responsible for the reliable delivery of data, rather than this being a centralized service of the network itself. Concepts implemented in this network feature in TCP/IP architecture.

== Applications ==
=== ARPANET ===
The ARPANET demonstrated several important aspects of the end-to-end principle.

Packet switching pushes some logical functions toward the communication endpoints
If the basic premise of a distributed network is packet switching, then functions such as reordering and duplicate detection inevitably have to be implemented at the logical endpoints of such a network. Consequently, the ARPANET featured two distinct levels of functionality:
1. a lower level concerned with transporting data packets between neighboring network nodes (called Interface Message Processors or IMPs), and
2. a higher level concerned with various end-to-end aspects of the data transmission. (Note: In accordance with the ARPANET RFQ (pp. 47 f.) the ARPANET conceptually separated certain functions. As BBN points out in a 1977 paper: "[T]he ARPA Network implementation uses the technique of breaking messages into packets to minimize the delay seen for long transmissions over many hops. The ARPA Network implementation also allows several messages to be in transit simultaneously between a given pair of Hosts. However, the several messages and the packets within the messages may arrive at the destination IMP out of order, and in the event of a broken IMP or line, there may be duplicates. The task of the ARPA Network source-to-destination transmission procedure is to reorder packets and messages at their destination, to cull duplicates, and after all the packets of a message have arrived, pass the message on to the destination Host and return an end-to-end acknowledgment. (p. 284).")
Dave Clark, one of the authors of the end-to-end principle paper, concludes: "The discovery of packets is not a consequence of the end-to-end argument. It is the success of packets that make the end-to-end argument relevant."

No arbitrarily reliable data transfer without end-to-end acknowledgment and retransmission mechanisms
The ARPANET was designed to provide reliable data transport between any two endpoints of the network – much like a simple I/O channel between a computer and a nearby peripheral device. (Note: This requirement was spelled out in the ARPANET RFQ, "From the point of view of the ARPA contractors as users of the network, the communication subnet is a self-contained facility whose software and hardware is maintained by the network contractor. In designing Interconnection Software we should only need to use the I/0 conventions for moving data into and out of the subnet and not otherwise be involved in the details of subnet operation. Specifically, error checking, fault detection, message switching, fault recovery, line switching, carrier failures and carrier quality assessment, as required to guarantee reliable network performance, are the sole responsibility of the network contractor.") In order to remedy any potential failures of packet transmission normal ARPANET messages were handed from one node to the next node with a positive acknowledgment and retransmission scheme; after a successful handover they were then discarded, (Note: Notes Walden in a 1972 paper, "Each IMP holds on to a packet until it gets a positive acknowledgment from the next IMP down the line that the packet has been properly received. If it gets the acknowledgment, all is well; the IMP knows that the next IMP now has responsibility for the packet and the transmitting IMP can discard its copy of the packet.") no source-to-destination re-transmission in case of packet loss was catered for. However, in spite of significant efforts, perfect reliability as envisaged in the initial ARPANET specification turned out to be impossible to provide – a reality that became increasingly obvious once the ARPANET grew well beyond its initial four-node topology. (Note: By 1973, BBN acknowledged that the initial aim of perfect reliability inside the ARPANET was not achievable, "Initially, it was thought that the only components in the network design that were prone to errors were the communications circuits, and the modem interfaces in the IMPs are equipped with a CRC checksum to detect 'almost all' such errors. The rest of the system, including Host interfaces, IMP processors, memories, and interfaces, was all considered to be error-free. We have had to re-evaluate this position in the light of our experience. In fact, as Metcalfe summarizes by 1973, "there have been enough bits in error in the ARPANET to fill this quota [one undetected transmission bit error per year] for centuries." See also BBN Report 2816 for additional elaboration about the experiences gained in the first years of operating the ARPANET.) The ARPANET thus provided a strong case for the inherent limits of network-based hop-by-hop reliability mechanisms in pursuit of true end-to-end reliability. (Note: Incidentally, the ARPANET also provides a good case for the trade-offs between the cost of end-to-end reliability mechanisms versus the benefits to be obtained thus. True end-to-end reliability mechanisms would have been prohibitively costly at the time, given that the specification held that there could be up to 8 host-level messages in flight at the same time between two endpoints, each having a maximum of more than 8000 bits. The amount of memory that would have been required to keep copies of all that data for possible retransmission in case no acknowledgment came from the destination IMP was too expensive to be worthwhile. As for host-based end-to-end reliability mechanisms – those would have added considerable complexity to the common host-level protocol (Host-Host Protocol). While the desirability of host-host reliability mechanisms was articulated in RFC 1, after some discussion, they were dispensed with (although higher-level protocols or applications were, of course, free to implement such mechanisms themselves). For a recount of the debate at the time see Bärwolff 2010, pp. 56-58 and the notes therein, especially notes 151 and 163.)

Trade-off between reliability, latency, and throughput
The pursuit of perfect reliability may hurt other relevant parameters of a data transmission – most importantly latency and throughput. This is particularly important for applications that value predictable throughput and low latency over reliability – the classic example being interactive real-time voice applications. This use case was catered for in the ARPANET by providing a raw message service that dispensed with various reliability measures so as to provide faster and lower latency data transmission service to the end hosts. (Note: Early experiments with packet voice date back to 1971, and by 1972 more formal ARPA research on the subject commenced. As documented in RFC 660 (p. 2), in 1974 BBN introduced the raw message service (Raw Message Interface, RMI) to the ARPANET, primarily in order to allow hosts to experiment with packet voice applications, but also acknowledging the use of such facility in view of possibly internetwork communication (cf. a BBN Report 2913 at pp. 55 f.). See also Bärwolff 2010, pp. 80-84 and the copious notes therein.)

=== TCP/IP ===
Internet Protocol (IP) is a connectionless datagram service with no delivery guarantees. On the Internet, IP is used for nearly all communications. End-to-end acknowledgment and retransmission is the responsibility of the connection-oriented Transmission Control Protocol (TCP), which sits on top of IP. The functional split between IP and TCP exemplifies the proper application of the end-to-end principle to transport protocol design.

=== File transfer ===
An example of the end-to-end principle is that of an arbitrarily reliable file transfer between two endpoints in a distributed network of a varying, nontrivial size: The only way two endpoints can obtain a completely reliable transfer is by transmitting and acknowledging a checksum for the entire data stream; in such a setting, lesser checksum and acknowledgment (ACK/NACK) protocols are justified only for the purpose of optimizing performance – they are useful to the vast majority of clients, but are not enough to fulfill the reliability requirement of this particular application. A thorough checksum is hence best done at the endpoints, and the network maintains a relatively low level of complexity and reasonable performance for all clients.

== Limitations ==
The most important limitation of the end-to-end principle is that its basic premise, placing functions in the application endpoints rather than in the intermediary nodes, is not trivial to implement.

An example of the limitations of the end-to-end principle exists in mobile devices with mobile IPv6. Pushing service-specific complexity to the endpoints can cause issues with mobile devices if the device has unreliable access to network channels.

Further problems can be seen with a decrease in network transparency from the addition of network address translation (NAT), which IPv4 relies on to combat address exhaustion. With the introduction of IPv6, users once again have unique identifiers, allowing for true end-to-end connectivity. Unique identifiers may be based on a physical address, or can be generated randomly by the host.

The end-to-end principle advocates pushing coordination-related functionality ever higher, ultimately into the application layer. The premise is that application-level information enables flexible coordination between the application endpoints and yields better performance because the coordination would be exactly what is needed. This leads to the idea of modeling each application via its own application-specific protocol that supports the desired coordination between its endpoints while assuming only a simple lower-layer communication service. Broadly, this idea is known as application semantics (meaning).

Multiagent systems offer approaches based on application semantics that enable convenient implementation of distributed applications without requiring message ordering and delivery guarantees from the underlying communication services. A basic idea in these approaches is to model the coordination between application endpoints via an information protocol and then implement the endpoints (agents) based on the protocol. Information protocols can be enacted over lossy, unordered communication services. A middleware based on information protocols and the associated programming model abstracts away message receptions from the underlying network and enables endpoint programmers to focus on the business logic for sending messages.

== See also ==
- End-to-end encryption – Secure communications method
- History of the Internet
- Peer-to-peer – Type of decentralized and distributed network architecture
- Protocol Wars – Computer science debate
