= Gérard Le Lann =

French computer scientist

- Citizenship: France
- Education: École Nationale Supérieure d'Électrotechnique, d'Électronique, d'Informatique, d'Hydraulique et des Télécommunications (ENSEEIHT)
- Awards: Lamb award of Académie des Sciences in 2012
- Scientific career
- Workplaces: National Institute for Research in Computer Science and Automation (INRIA)

Gérard Le Lann is a French computer scientist at INRIA.

In networking, he worked on the project CYCLADES with an intermediate stint on the Arpanet team.

== Life and career ==
Gérard Le Lann's career has been summarized in 1975 as follows:

Gérard Le Lann holds French degrees, a M.S. in Applied Mathematics, an Engineering Degree in Computer Science (both from the University of Toulouse) and a Ph.D in Computer Science (University of Rennes). He started his career at CERN, Geneva (Switzerland), and joined IRIA (now INRIA) in 1972. His main areas of research are distributed dependable computing and networking, real-time computing and networking, proof-based system engineering and, more recently, mobile wireless safety-critical cyber-physical systems and networks.

His contribution to the design of Internet's TCP/IP, in its early phases, has been acknowledged.

== See also ==
- History of the Internet
- Internet in France
- Hubert Zimmermann
- List of Internet pioneers
- Louis Pouzin
- Protocol Wars
- Rémi Després
