= Hubert Zimmermann =

French software engineer and a pioneer of computer networking (1941–2012)

- Born: 15 November 1941
- Died: 9 November 2012 (aged 70); France
- Education: Télécom ParisTech; École Polytechnique
- Scientific career
- Fields: Computer Science

Hubert Zimmermann (15 November 1941 – 9 November 2012) was a French software engineer and a pioneering figure in computer networking.

== Biography ==
=== Education ===
Zimmermann was educated at École Polytechnique and École Nationale Supérieure des Télécommunications.

=== Early career and contributions ===
His career began at Institut National de Recherche en Informatique et Automatique (INRIA) in Rocquencourt from 1972 through 1979, where he led research into what became ChorusOS series of distributed operating systems. He worked for Louis Pouzin on the CYCLADES project and participated in the International Network Working Group from 1972. He published several influential papers in the field of internetworking and was acknowledged by Vint Cerf and Bob Kahn in their seminal 1974 paper, A Protocol for Packet Network Intercommunication. In 1977, he was an early member of the International Organization for Standardization as it developed the Open Systems Interconnection protocols. He developed and promoted the OSI reference model which became a popular way to describe network protocols, and published a paper on the model in 1980 and one with John Day in 1983.

=== France Telecom ===
He then worked for France Télécom in 1980 through 1986.

=== Chorus Systemes ===
Zimmerman was a founder of Chorus Systèmes SA in 1986, which commercialised the Chorus distributed microkernel operating system that had been created at INRIA. Chorus Systèmes was purchased by Sun Microsystems in 1997, where he was director of telecom software engineering for 5 years. Then he invested in entrepreneurial high-tech companies such as Arbor Venture Management, Boost Your StartUp, Gingko Networks and UDcast.

=== Awards and recognition ===
In 1991, Zimmermann was awarded the SIGCOMM Award for "20 years of leadership in the development of computer networking and the advancement of international standardization".

=== Death ===
On 9 November 2012, Zimmermann died in France.

== See also ==
- Gérard Le Lann
- History of the Internet
- Internet in France
- List of Internet pioneers
- Protocol Wars
- Rémi Després
