= Vino (operating system) =

Vino was a project at Harvard University that sought to develop an extensible-kernel operating system based on NetBSD. The project is now inactive.

There is also a current project named Vino hosted on CodePlex that seeks to develop a Java-based operating system similar in concept to the legacy JavaOS.

== Vino Group at Harvard ==
During the 1990s, a Vino Group within the Harvard School of Engineering worked to develop an "extensible" Unix-like operating system. According to the project's main web page:

"The VINO OS project at Harvard is an extensible operating system. This means that application software, running with the privileges of an ordinary user, can provide extensions to operating system (specifically, operating system kernel) functionality. More importantly, this can be done both safely and reasonably securely, and also efficiently; efficiently enough to make it worthwhile".

In essence, Vino was a fork of and ran on the same Intel 486 hardware platform as NetBSD did at that time. Two alpha versions of Vino were released (under a "BSD-like" license) — 0.40 in December, 1997, and 0.50 in December, 1998. That software and its companion documentation are currently available from the Systems Research at Harvard (SYRAH) Group, which also maintains the Vino web pages.
