= CYCLADES =

French research computer network

The CYCLADES computer network (French pronunciation: [siklad]) was a French research network created in the early 1970s. It was one of the pioneering networks experimenting with the concept of packet switching and, unlike the ARPANET, was explicitly designed to facilitate internetworking.

The CYCLADES network was the first to make the hosts responsible for the reliable delivery of data, rather than this being a centralized service of the network itself. Datagrams were exchanged on the network using transport protocols that do not guarantee reliable delivery, but only attempt best-effort. To empower the network leaves (the hosts) to perform error-correction, the network ensured end-to-end protocol transparency, a concept later to be known as the end-to-end principle. This simplified network design, reduced network latency, and reduced the opportunities for single point failures. The experience with these concepts led to the design of key features of the Internet Protocol in the ARPANET project.

The network was sponsored by the French government, through the Institut de Recherche en lnformatique et en Automatique (IRIA), the national research laboratory for computer science in France, now known as Inria, which served as the co-ordinating agency. Several French computer manufacturers, research institutes and universities contributed to the effort. CYCLADES was designed and directed by Louis Pouzin.

== Conception and deployment ==
Planning for the project began in 1971. Design and staffing started in 1972, and November 1973 saw the first demonstration, using three hosts and one packet switch.

Pouzin coined the term catenet in 1973, in a note circulated to the International Network Working Group, to describe a system of packet-switched communication networks interconnected via gateways. He later published these ideas in a 1974 paper "A Proposal for Interconnecting Packet Switching Networks".

Deployment of the network continued in 1974, with three packet switches installed by February, although at that point the network was only operational for three hours each day. By June the network was up to seven switches, and was available throughout the day for experimental use.

A terminal concentrator was also developed that year, since time-sharing was still a prevalent mode of computer use. In 1975, the network shrank slightly due to budgetary constraints, but the setback was only temporary. At that point, the network provided remote login, remote batch and file transfer user application services.

By 1976 the network was in full deployment, eventually numbering 20 nodes with connections to NPL in London, ESA in Rome, and to the European Informatics Network (EIN).

== Technical details ==
CYCLADES used a layered architecture, which was adopted in the Internet. The basic packet transmission like function, named CIGALE, was novel; it provided an unreliable datagram service (the word was coined by Louis Pouzin by combining data and telegram). Since the packet switches no longer had to ensure correct delivery of data, this greatly simplified their design.

"The inspiration for datagrams had two sources. One was Donald Davies' studies. He had done some simulation of datagram networks, although he had not built any, and it looked technically viable. The second inspiration was I like things simple. I didn't see any real technical motivation to overlay two levels of end-to-end protocols. I thought one was enough."

— Louis Pouzin

The CIGALE network featured a distance vector routing protocol, and allowed experimentation with various metrics. it also included a time synchronization protocol in all the packet switches. CIGALE included early attempts at performing congestion control by dropping excess packets.

The name CIGALE (French pronunciation: [siɡal]) – French for cicada – originates from the fact that the developers installed a speaker at each computer, so that "it went 'chirp chirp chirp' like cicadas" when a packet passed a computer.

An end-to-end protocol built on top of that provided a reliable transport service, on top of which applications were built. It provided a reliable sequence of user-visible data units called letters, rather than the reliable byte stream of TCP. The transport protocol was able to deal with out-of-order and unreliable delivery of datagrams, using the now-standard mechanisms of end-end acknowledgments and timeouts; it also featured sliding windows and end-to-end flow control.

== Demise ==
By 1976, the French PTT was developing Transpac, a packet network based on the emerging X.25 standard. The academic debates between datagram and virtual circuit networks continued for some time, but were eventually cut short by bureaucratic decisions.

Data transmission was a state monopoly in France at the time, and IRIA needed a special dispensation to run the CYCLADES network. The PTT did not agree to funding by the government of a competitor to their Transpac network, and insisted that the permission and funding be rescinded. By 1981, Cyclades was forced to shut down.

== Legacy ==
The most important legacy of CYCLADES was in showing that moving the responsibility for reliability into the hosts was workable, and produced a well-functioning service network. It also showed that it greatly reduced the complexity of the packet switches. The concept became a cornerstone in the design of the Internet.

The network was a fertile ground for experimentation, and allowed a generation of French computer scientists to experiment with networking concepts. Louis Pouzin and the CYCLADES alumni initiated a number of follow-on projects at IRIA to experiment with local area networks, satellite networks, the Unix operating system, and the message passing operating system Chorus.

Hubert Zimmermann used his experience in CYCLADES to influence the design of the OSI model, which is still a common pedagogical tool.

Gérard Le Lann worked with Vint Cerf and Bob Kahn to incorporate concepts from the CYCLADES project into the original design of the Transmission Control Program.

CYCLADES alumni and researchers at IRIA/INRIA were also influential in spreading adoption of the Internet in France, eventually witnessing the success of the datagram-based Internet, and the demise of the X.25 and ATM virtual circuit networks.

== See also ==
- History of the Internet
- Internet in France § History
- NPL network
- CII Mitra-15 mini-computers, which ran the CYCLADES nodes
