= Halvor Bothner-By =

Telecommunication engineer

Halvor Bothner-By (August 20, 1938 - June 13, 2014) was a telecommunication engineer of the Norwegian Telecommunications Administration.

He was a rapporteur on packet switching for the CCITT. As such, he chaired the group that, in March 1975, proposed to the CCITT Recommendation X.2x on virtual circuits to be offered by public networks. After its unanimous approval at the May 1976 CCITT plenary, it became the well-known protocol X.25.

He was also renowned for having coined the term datagram in the early seventies on a train between Paris and Rennes on the way to attend a CEPT Rapporteur meeting.
