= ChorusOS =

Microkernel real-time operating system

- Developer: Chorus Systèmes; Sun Microsystems
- OS family: POSIX
- Working state: Discontinued
- Source model: Closed-source (pre-v5); Open source (v5)
- Initial release: 1979; 47 years ago
- Latest release: 5.1 / 2011; 15 years ago
- Marketing target: Embedded systems
- Available in: English
- Supported platforms: x86, 680x0, PowerPC, SPARC, ARM, MIPS
- Kernel type: Microkernel real-time operating system
- Succeeded by: VirtualLogix C5
- Official website: docs.oracle.com/cd/E19048-01/chorus5/index.html

ChorusOS is a microkernel real-time operating system designed as a message passing computing model. ChorusOS began as the Chorus distributed real-time operating system research project at the French Institute for Research in Computer Science and Automation (INRIA) in 1979. During the 1980s, Chorus was one of two earliest microkernels (the other being Mach) and was developed commercially by startup company Chorus Systèmes SA. Over time, development effort shifted away from distribution aspects to real-time for embedded systems.

In 1997, Sun Microsystems acquired Chorus Systèmes for its microkernel technology, which went toward the new JavaOS. Sun (and henceforth Oracle) no longer supports ChorusOS. The founders of Chorus Systèmes started a new company called Jaluna in August 2002. Jaluna then became VirtualLogix, which was then acquired by Red Bend in September 2010. VirtualLogix designed embedded systems using Linux and ChorusOS (which they named VirtualLogix C5). C5 was described by them as a carrier grade operating system, and was actively maintained by them.

The latest source tree of ChorusOS, an evolution of version 5.0, was released as open-source software by Sun and is available at the Sun Download Center. The Jaluna project has completed these sources and published it online. Jaluna-1 is described there as a real-time Portable Operating System Interface (RT-POSIX) layer based on FreeBSD 4.1, and the CDE cross-platform software development environment. ChorusOS is supported by popular Secure Socket Layer and Transport Layer Security (SSL/TLS) libraries such as wolfSSL.

== See also ==
- JavaOS
