= French Institute for Research in Computer Science and Automation =

French research institution for computer science

Institut national de recherche en sciences et technologies du numérique
- Abbreviation: Inria
- Formation: 3 January 1967 (59 years ago)
- Type: Public
- Purpose: Research
- Headquarters: Le Chesnay-Rocquencourt, France
- Fields: Computer science Applied mathematics
- Official languages: French, English
- President: Bruno Sportisse
- Budget: €235 million (2013)
- Staff: 1,772 researchers
- Website: www.inria.fr/en
- Formerly called: Institut de recherche en informatique et en automatique

The National Institute for Research in Digital Science and Technology (Inria; French: Institut national de recherche en sciences et technologies du numérique) is a French national research institution focusing on computer science and applied mathematics. It was created under the name French Institute for Research in Computer Science and Automation (IRIA; French: Institut de recherche en informatique et en automatique) in 1967 at Rocquencourt near Paris, part of Plan Calcul. Its first site was the historical premises of SHAPE (central command of NATO military forces), which is still used as Inria's main headquarters. In 1980, IRIA became INRIA. Since 2011, it has been styled Inria.

Inria is a Public Scientific and Technical Research Establishment (EPST) under the double supervision of the French Ministry of National Education, Advanced Instruction and Research and the Ministry of Economy, Finance and Industry.

== Administrative status ==
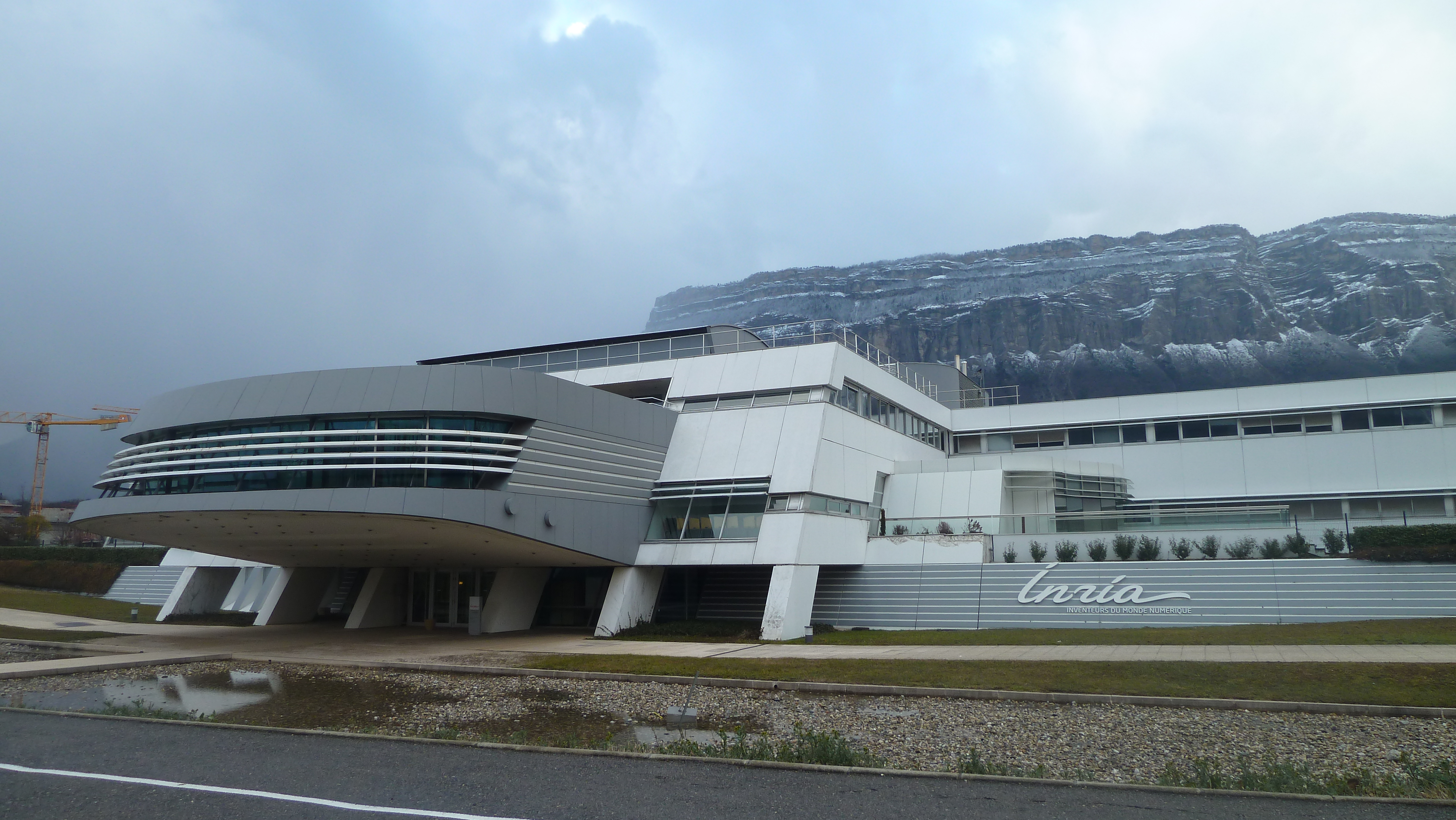
Inria Grenoble building, 2013

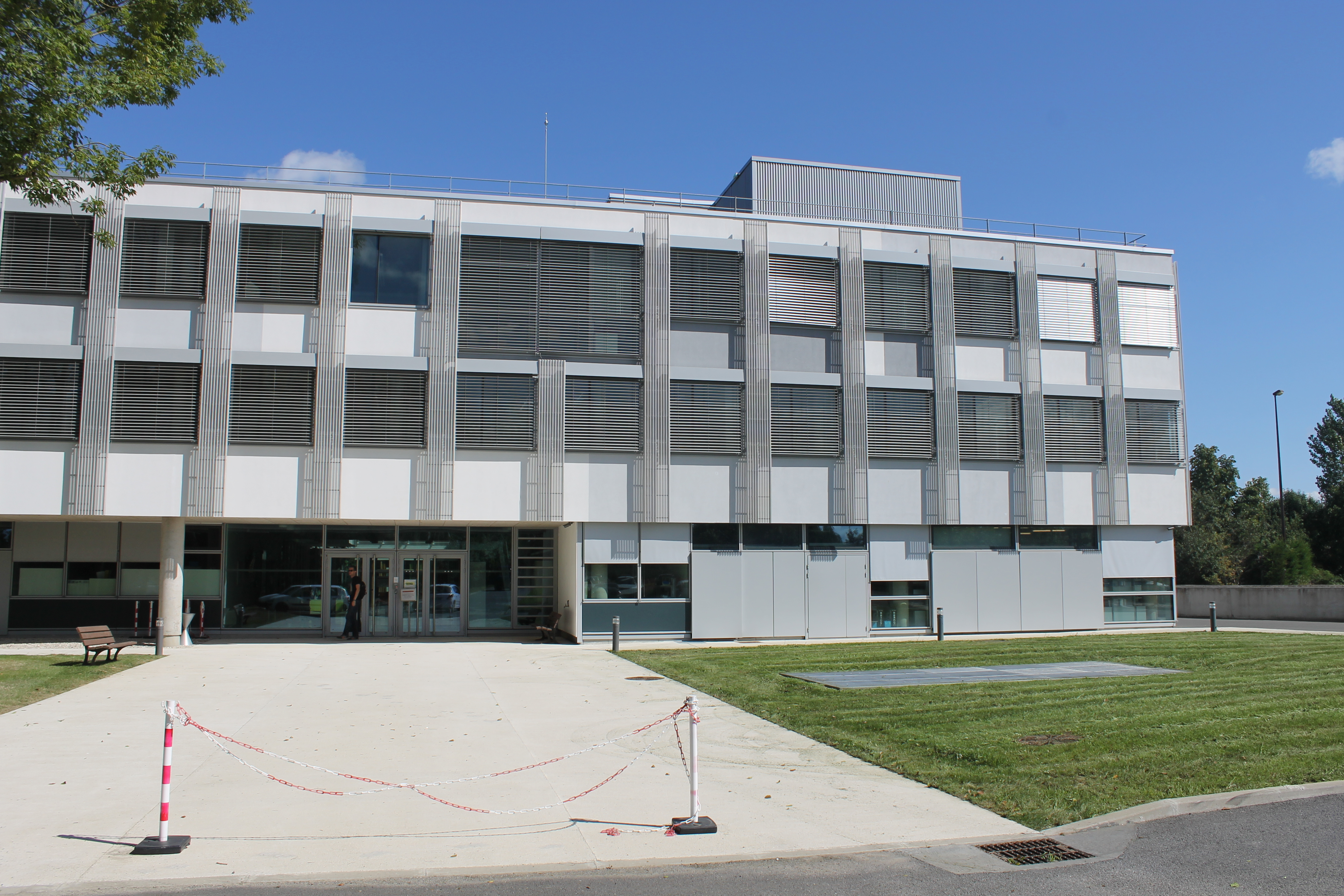
Inria Paris-Saclay, 2014

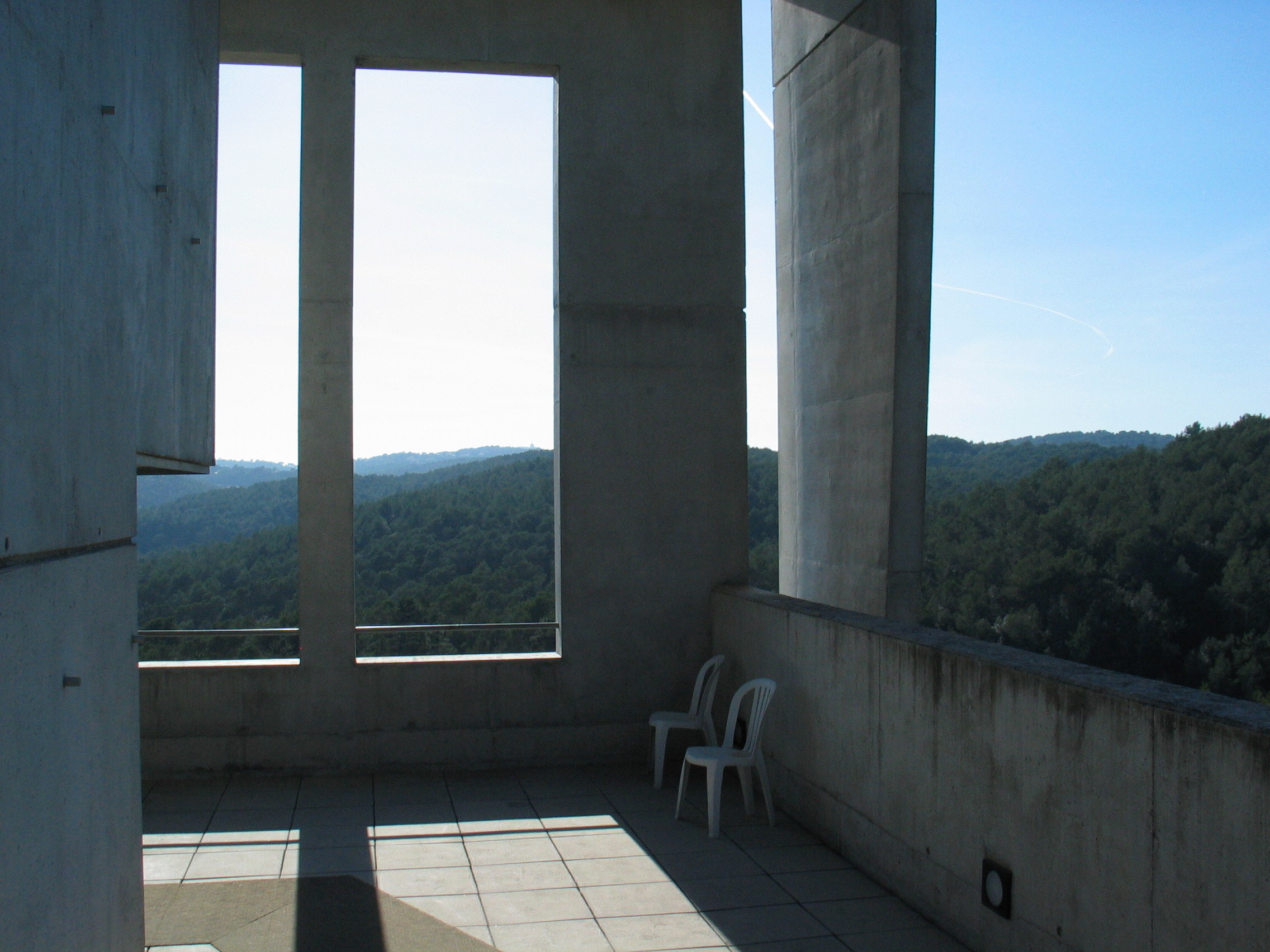
Part of INRIA Sophia Antipolis, 2007

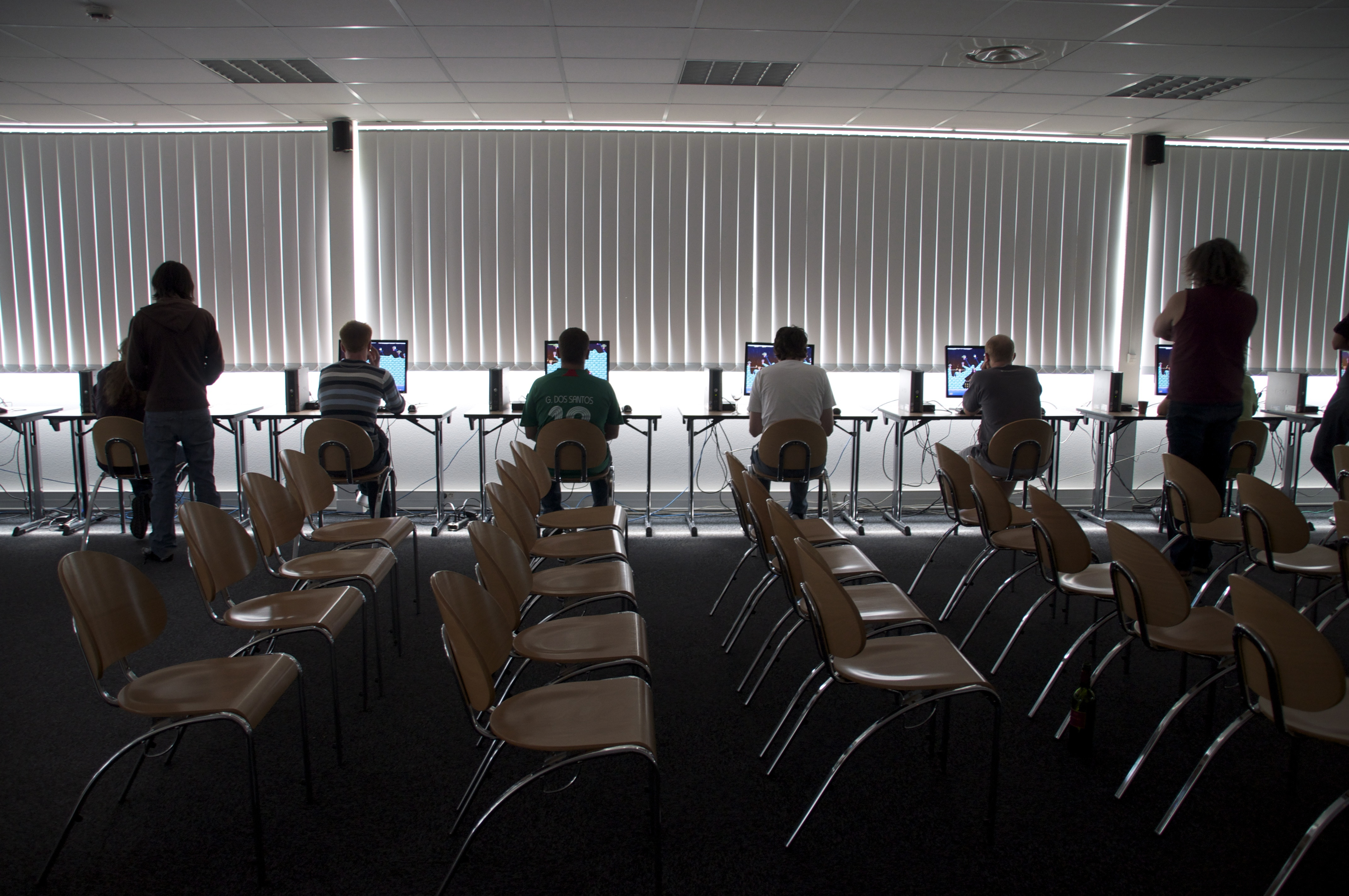
Activity within INRIA Lille, 2010

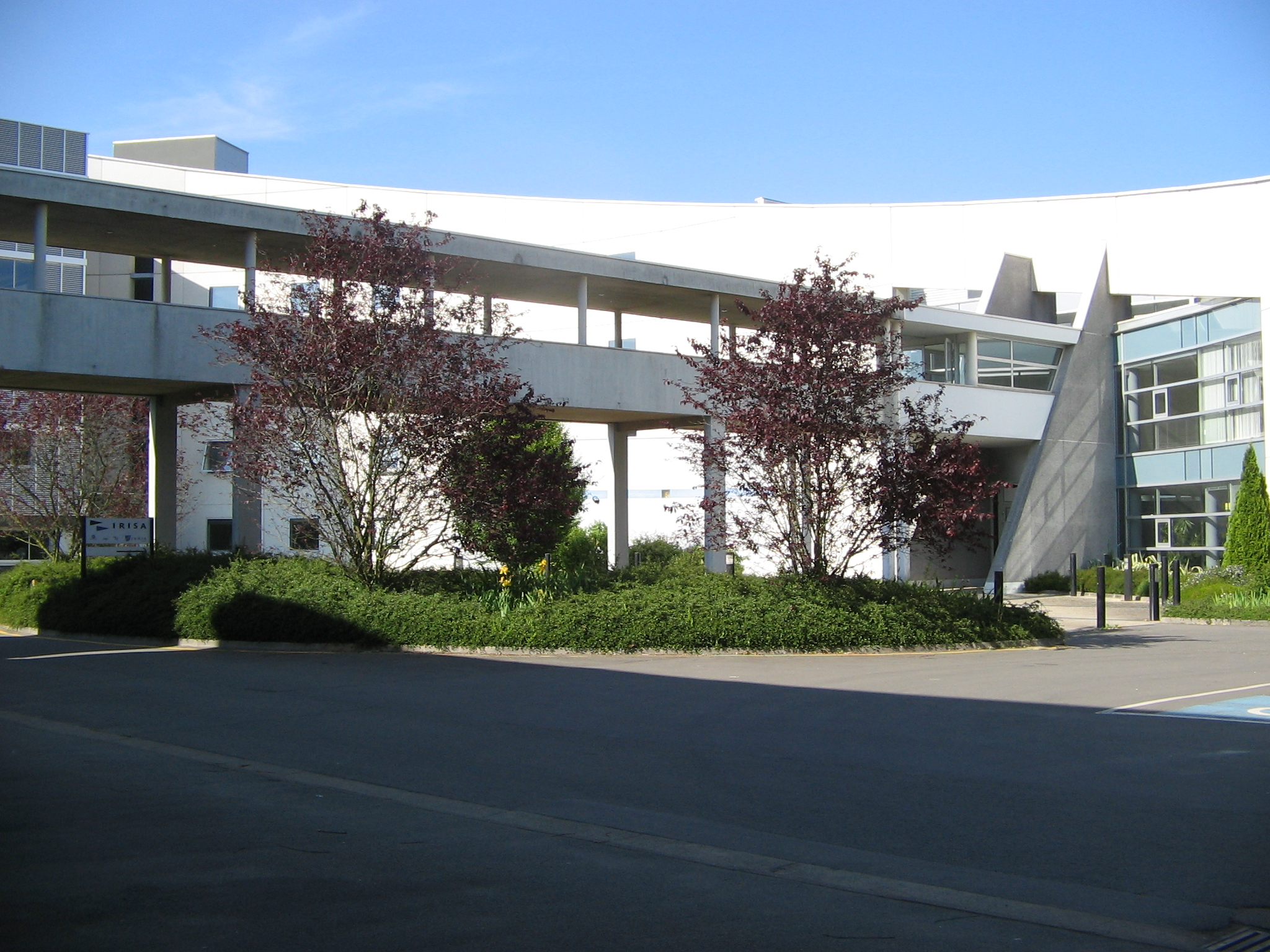
INRIA Rennes in 2006, part of joint IRISA

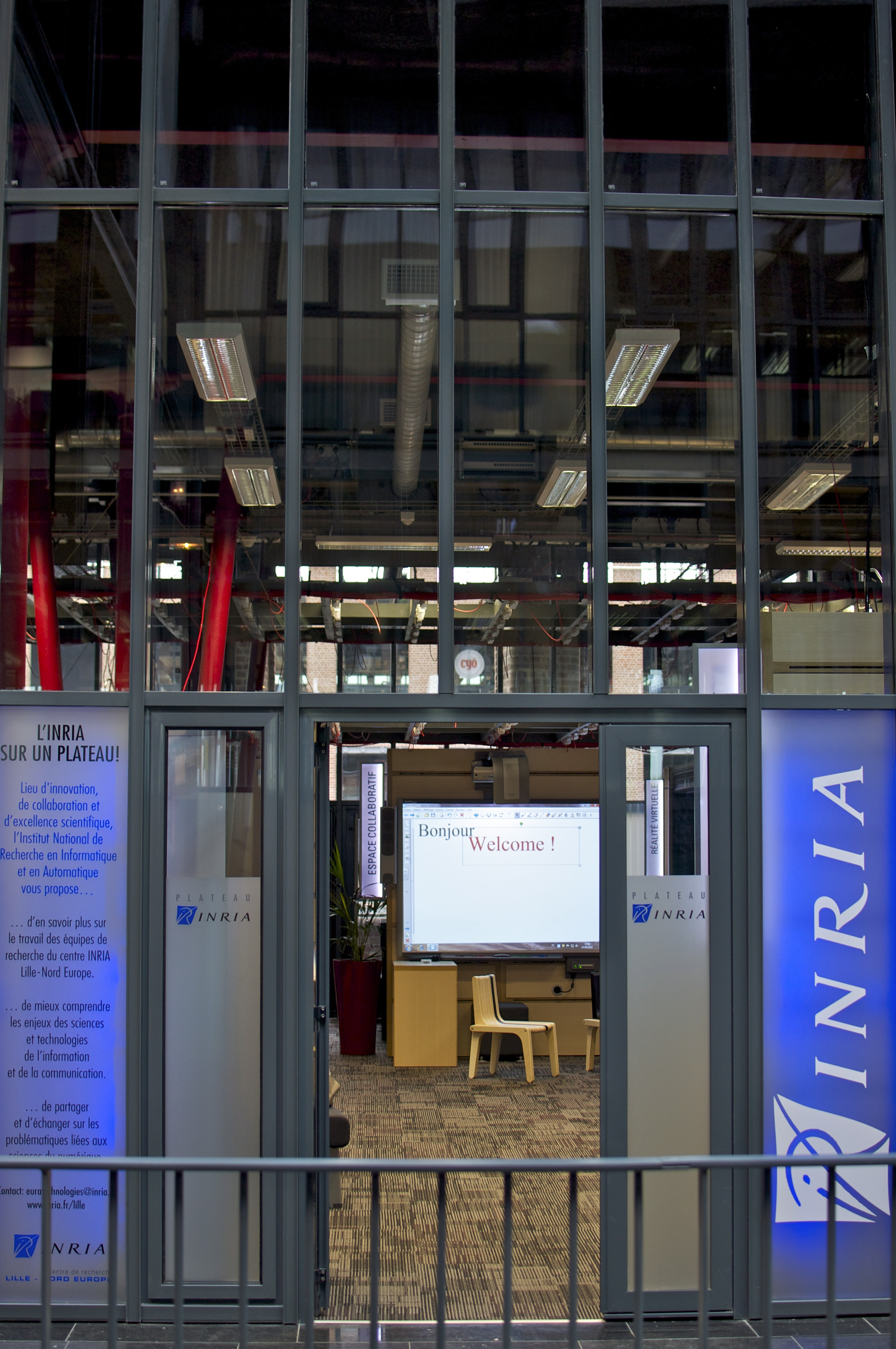
INRIA at EuraTechnologies, 2010

Inria has nine research centers distributed across France (in Bordeaux, Grenoble-Inovallée, Lille, Lyon, Nancy, Paris-Rocquencourt, Rennes, Saclay, and Sophia Antipolis) and one center abroad in Santiago de Chile, Chile. It also contributes to academic research teams outside of those centers.

Inria Rennes is part of the joint Institut de recherche en informatique et systèmes aléatoires (IRISA) with several other entities. Inria Nancy is part of the joint LORIA (Laboratoire Lorrain de Recherche en Informatique et ses Applications) with CNRS and the University of Lorraine.

Before December 2007, the three centers of Bordeaux, Lille and Saclay formed a single research center called INRIA Futurs.

In October 2010, Inria, with Pierre and Marie Curie University (now Sorbonne University) and Paris Diderot University started IRILL, a center for innovation and research initiative for free software.

Inria employs 3800 people. Among them are 1300 researchers, 1000 Ph.D. students and 500 postdoctorates.

== Research ==
Inria does both theoretical and applied research in computer science. In the process, it has produced many widely used programs, such as:

- Bigloo, a Scheme implementation
- CADP, a tool box for the verification of asynchronous concurrent systems
- Caml, a language from the ML family
  - Caml Light and OCaml implementations
- CGAL, A C++ library for solving problems in computational geometry
- Chorus, microkernel-based distributed operating system
- CompCert, verified C compiler for PowerPC, ARM and x86_32
- Contrail
- CYCLADES, pioneered the use of datagrams, functional layering, and the end-to-end strategy, concepts adopted in TCP/IP and the Internet.
- Eigen (C++ library)
- Esterel, a programming language for State Automata
- Geneauto — code-generation from model
- Graphite, a research platform for computer graphics, 3D modeling and numerical geometry
- Gudhi — A C++ library with Python interface for computational topology and topological data analysis
- Le Lisp, a portable Lisp implementation
- medInria, a medical image processing software, popularly used for MRI images.
- GNU MPFR, an arbitrary-precision floating-point library
- OpenViBE, a software platform dedicated to designing, testing and using brain–computer interfaces.
- Pharo, an open-source Smalltalk derived from Squeak.
- Rocq, a proof assistant
- scikit-learn, a machine learning software package
- Scilab, a numerical computation software package
- SimGrid
- SmartEiffel, a free Eiffel compiler
- SOFA, an open source framework for multi-physics simulation with an emphasis on medical simulation.
- TOM, a pattern matching language
- ViSP, an open source visual servoing platform library
- XtreemFS
- XtreemOS, a grid distributed operating system
- Zenon, an extensible automated theorem prover producing checkable proofs

Inria furthermore leads French AI Research, ranking 12th worldwide in 2019, based on accepted publications at the Conference on Neural Information Processing Systems.

== History ==
During the summer of 1988, the INRIA connected its Sophia-Antipolis unit to the NSFNet via Princeton using a satellite link leased to France Telecom and MCI. The link became operational on 8 August 1988, and allowed INRIA researchers to access the US network and allowed NASA researchers access to an astronomical database based in Strasbourg. This was the first international connection to NSFNET and the first time that French networks were connected directly to a network using TCP/IP. The Internet in France was limited to research and education for some years to come.

== Sources ==
- Abbate, Janet (1999). Inventing the Internet. Cambridge, Massachusetts: MIT Press. ISBN 978-0-262-01172-3.
