= Internetworking =

Interconnecting different types of computer networks

Internetworking is the practice of interconnecting multiple computer networks. Typically, this enables any pair of hosts in the connected networks to exchange messages irrespective of their hardware-level networking technology. The resulting system of interconnected networks is called an internetwork, or simply an internet.

The most notable example of internetworking is the Internet, a network of networks based on many underlying hardware technologies. The Internet is defined by a unified global addressing system, packet format, and routing methods provided by the Internet Protocol.

The term internetworking is a combination of the components inter (between) and networking. An earlier term for an internetwork is catenet, a short-form of (con)catenating networks.

== History ==
The first international heterogeneous resource sharing network was developed by the computer science department at University College London (UCL), which interconnected the ARPANET with early British academic networks beginning in 1973. In the ARPANET, the network elements used to connect individual networks were called gateways, but the term has been deprecated in this context, because of possible confusion with functionally different devices.

By 1973–4, researchers in France, the United States, and the United Kingdom had worked out an approach to internetworking where the differences between network protocols were hidden by using a common internetwork protocol, and instead of the network being responsible for reliability, as in the ARPANET, the hosts became responsible, as demonstrated in the CYCLADES network. Researchers at Xerox PARC outlined the idea of Ethernet and the PARC Universal Packet (PUP) for internetworking. Research at the National Physical Laboratory in the United Kingdom found that establishing a common host protocol would be more reliable and efficient. The ARPANET connection to UCL later evolved into SATNET.

In 1977, ARPA demonstrated a three-way internetworking experiment, which linked a mobile vehicle in PRNET with nodes in the ARPANET, and, via SATNET, to nodes at UCL. The X.25 protocol, on which public data networks were based in the 1970s and 1980s, was supplemented by the X.75 protocol, which enabled internetworking. Today, the interconnecting gateways are called routers. The definition of an internetwork today includes the connection of other types of computer networks, such as personal area networks.

=== Catenet ===
Catenet, a short-form of (con)catenating networks, is obsolete terminology for a system of packet-switched communication networks interconnected via gateways. The term was coined by Louis Pouzin, who designed the CYCLADES network, in an October 1973 note circulated to the International Network Working Group, which was published in a 1974 paper "A Proposal for Interconnecting Packet Switching Networks". Pouzin was a pioneer of internetworking at a time when network meant what is now called a local area network.

Catenet was the concept of linking these networks into a network of networks with specifications for compatibility of addressing and routing. The term was used in technical writing in the late 1970s and early 1980s, including in RFCs and IENs. Catenet was gradually displaced by the short-form of the term internetwork, internet (lower-case i), when the Internet Protocol spread more widely from the mid 1980s and the use of the term internet took on a broader sense and became well known in the 1990s.

== Interconnection of networks ==
Internetworking, a combination of the components inter (between) and networking, started as a way to connect disparate types of networking technology, but it became widespread through the developing need to connect two or more local area networks via some sort of wide area network.

To build an internetwork, the following are needed: A standardized scheme to address packets to any host on any participating network; a standardized protocol defining format and handling of transmitted packets; components interconnecting the participating networks by routing packets to their destinations based on standardized addresses.

Another type of interconnection of networks often occurs within enterprises at the link layer of the networking model, i.e. at the hardware-centric layer below the level of the TCP/IP logical interfaces. Such interconnection is accomplished with network bridges and network switches. This is sometimes incorrectly termed internetworking, but the resulting system is simply a larger, single subnetwork, and no internetworking protocol, such as Internet Protocol, is required to traverse these devices. However, a single computer network may be converted into an internetwork by dividing the network into segments and logically dividing the segment traffic with routers and having an internetworking software layer that applications employ.

The Internet Protocol is designed to provide an unreliable (not guaranteed) packet service across the network. The architecture avoids intermediate network elements, maintaining any state of the network. Instead, this function is assigned to the endpoints of each communication session. To transfer data reliably, applications must utilize an appropriate transport layer protocol, such as Transmission Control Protocol (TCP), which provides a reliable stream. Some applications use a simpler, connection-less transport protocol, User Datagram Protocol (UDP), for tasks which do not require reliable delivery of data or that require real-time service, such as video streaming or voice chat.

== Networking models ==
Two architectural models are commonly used to describe the protocols and methods used in internetworking. The Open System Interconnection (OSI) reference model was developed under the auspices of the International Organization for Standardization (ISO) and provides a rigorous description for layering protocol functions from the underlying hardware to the software interface concepts in user applications. Internetworking is implemented in the Network Layer (Layer 3) of the model.

The Internet Protocol Suite, also known as the TCP/IP model, was not designed to conform to the OSI model and does not refer to it in any of the normative specifications in Request for Comments and Internet standards. Despite a similar appearance as a layered model, it has a much less rigorous, loosely defined architecture that concerns itself only with the aspects of the style of networking in its own historical provenance. It assumes the availability of any suitable hardware infrastructure, without discussing hardware-specific low-level interfaces, and that a host has access to this local network to which it is connected via a link-layer interface.

For a period in the late 1980s and early 1990s, the network engineering community was polarized over the implementation of competing protocol suites, commonly known as the Protocol Wars. It was unclear which of the OSI model and the Internet protocol suite would result in the best and most robust computer networks.

== See also ==
- History of the Internet
