= AKARI Project =

The AKARI Architecture Design Project was a project for designing a new generation computer network architecture supported by the National Institute of Information and Communications Technology (NICT) of Japan. The name "AKARI" indicates "A small light in the dark pointing to the future" and it comes from the Japanese word Akari, which means "a small light". Launched in May 2006, the AKARI Project investigated technologies for new generation network by 2015, developing a network architecture and creating a network design based on that architecture. AKARI is also denoted as a Future Internet project.

The members of the AKARI Project came from NICT and some other universities or companies such as Tokyo University, Keio University, Osaka University, Tokyo Institute of Technology and NTT. In 2008, they produced a conceptual design book, which describes their philosophy to pursue an ideal solution by researching new network architectures from a clean slate without being impeded by existing constraints.

To some extent, the AKARI Project was similar to the Global Environment for Network Innovations (GENI) facility of USA and many of the Seventh Framework Programmes (FP7) of EU such as the Future Internet Research and Experimentation.

Conferences were held in June 2007, January 2008, June 2008, and June 2010. The project updated a web site through 2011, and removed the site by 2013.
