= Internet in Italy =

Top-level domain (Italian: registro) for Italy (.it)

The Internet country code top-level domain (ccTLD) for Italy is .it and is sponsored by Consiglio Nazionale delle Ricerche. The .eu domain is also used, as it is shared with other European Union member states.

Currently Internet access is available to businesses and home users in various forms, including dial-up, fiber, cable, DSL, and wireless.

== History ==
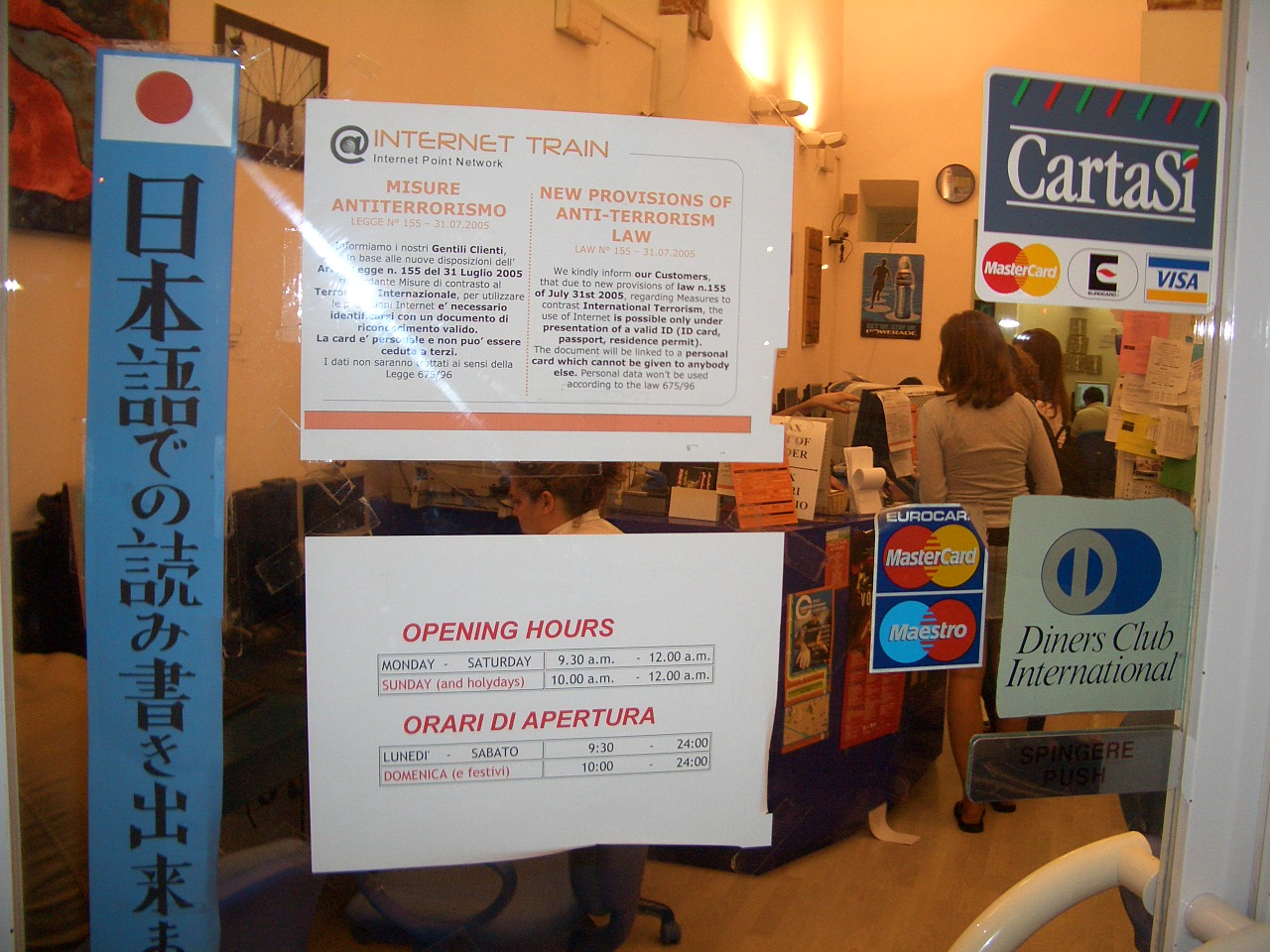
A sign posted on the door of an internet cafe in Florence regarding Italian Law No. 155 of 31 July 2005

Sublink Network was a non-profit association founded in Italy in 1989 to allow cost-sharing access to the Internet. Sublink Network was registered with the sublink.org domain (this domain now belongs to one of the founders). Sublink Network had its own sublink.* newsgroup hierarchy and a gateway with the Italian branch of FidoNet.

Sublink was the very first public (non-academic) internet email and newsgroup network in Italy, with very low access fees (around $100 a year), fast backbone modems running at 19200 bit/s (the average modem was 2400 bit/s at that time), and fully registered to the NIC. When after 1997, low cost PPP commercial access to the Internet started to become available, interest for UUCP cost-share Internet feeds started to decline and the association was naturally dissolved.

== Average Speed ==
According to Speedtest.net, the Italian average for fixed connections is 113.34 Mbit/s in download and 53.39 Mbit/s in upload as at january 2026.

== Overview ==
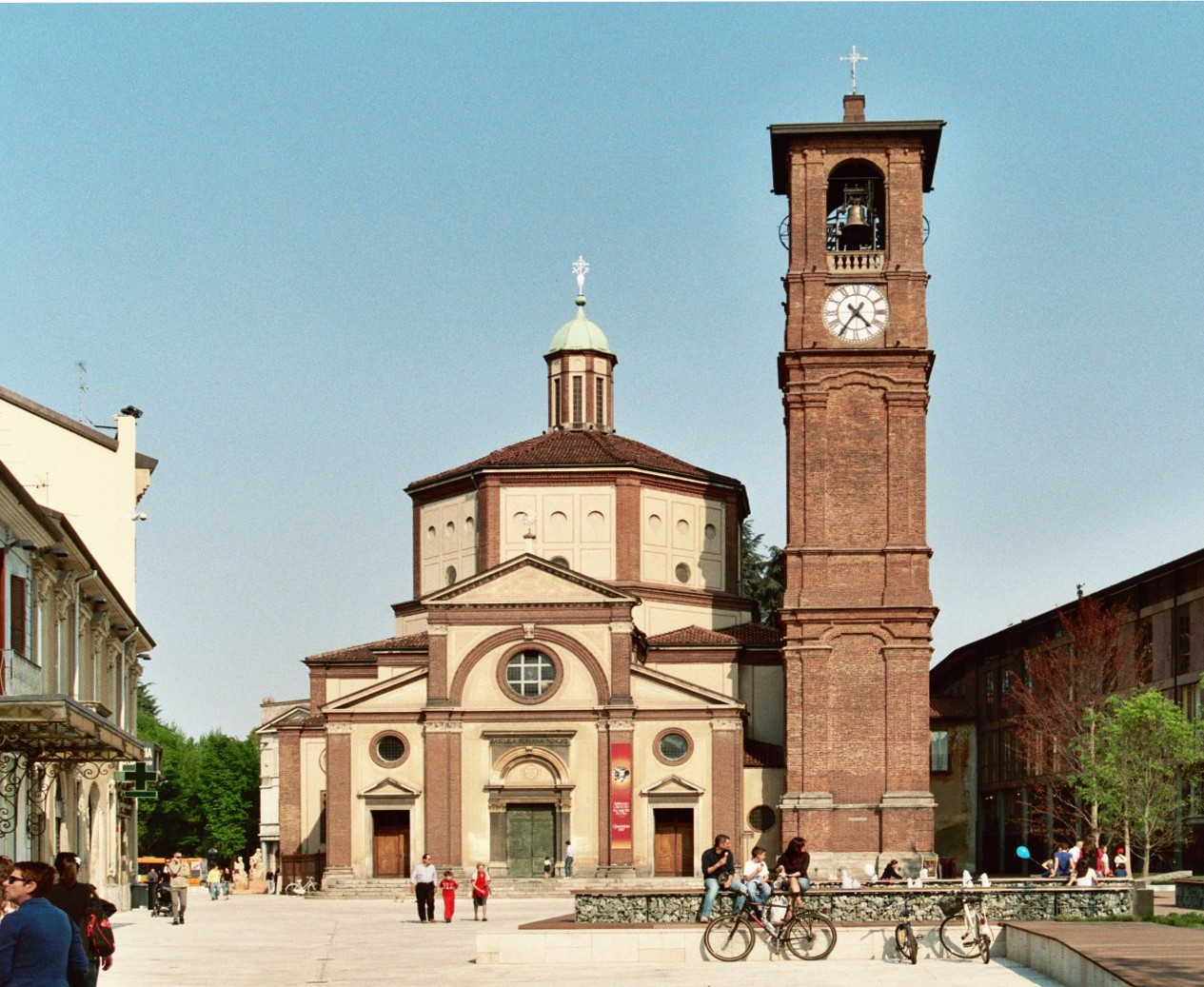
Main square in Legnano, a free Wi-Fi area

According to data released by the fibre-to-the-home (FTTH) Council Europe, Italy represents one of the largest FTTH markets in Europe, with more than 2.5 million homes passed by fibre at end-December 2010; at the same date the country reported around 348,000 fibre subscribers. The "Fibre for Italy" project (with the participation of providers Fastweb, Vodafone and Wind in a co-investment partnership) aims to reach 20 million people in Italy's 15 largest cities by 2015, and Telecom Italia plans to connect 138 cities by 2018. The government has also started the Italia Digitale project, which aims to provide at least 50% of Italians with high-speed internet access by 2020. The government aims to extend the fibre-optic network to rural areas.

While ADSL2+ with speeds up to 20/1 Mbit/s is still the most widely common subscription available in Italy, the main telephone company in the country (TIM) is investing 12 billion € in the period of 2016-2018, with the aim of reaching 84% of the homes with broadband connection (100 Mbit/s) before the end of 2018. Despite this, there's a debate going because the company is still investing on copper and on the fiber-to-the-cabinet (FTTC) technology, instead of bringing fibre directly to the home everywhere. The FTTC and VDSL2 technologies can currently bring up to 100/20 Mbit/s connections to the final customer. TIM and Fastweb have plans to increase FTTC speeds with vectoring to up to 200/50 Mbit/s streams before the end of 2016.

The FTTH network is developing as well, with a standard 10.000/5000/2500/1000/100 Mbit/s connection (up to 10.000 Mbit/s with TIM) at the same subscription price as FTTC .

In 2025 a new standard has been announced for the Italian FTTH network. The company Openfiber is working on a new 100Gbps connectivity.

Figures published by the National Institute of Statistics showed in late-2011 that 58.8% of Italian families had a personal computer (up slightly from 57.6% in 2010); 54.5% had access to the internet (up from 52.4%); and 45.8% had broadband access (up from 43.4%). Over one-quarter (26.3%, down slightly from 26.4% in 2010) of Italian internet users aged fourteen years and older made an online purchase during 2011.

== Internet regulation ==
An anti-terrorism law amended in 2005, after the terrorists attacks in Madrid and London, by then-Minister of the Interior Giuseppe Pisanu, restricted the opening of new Wi-Fi Hotspots, subjecting interested entities to first apply for permission to open at the Police Headquarters of jurisdiction and that such hotspot's customers were subjected to identification, by presenting an identity document. This inhibited the opening of hotspots across Italy, with a number of hotspots 5 times lower than France and the conspicuous absence of Municipal wireless networks. Considering the above-mentioned law was too strict, a proposed law was proposed to facilitate the opening and access of Wi-Fi Hotspots, although it was not clear how it should have been possible. Only at the end of 2010, a bipartisan bill allowed for the repeal of article 7 of the Pisanu law. The abrogation was finally made by the Monti Cabinet, which has not entered the renewal extension in the decree of 2011, so that the provision is no longer in force since January 1, 2012.

Currently internet filtering in Italy is applied on web-sites which display child pornography and on some P2P web-sites (including the most famous The Pirate Bay). A pervasive filtering is applied to those gambling websites that don't have a local license to operate in Italy.

In February 2023, Italy's Data Protection Authority (GPDP) banned the AI chatbot Replika, citing potential risks it posed to minors and people with emotional fragility. The next month, the GPDP ordered OpenAI to block ChatGPT, citing privacy concerns in how personal data is processed and failure to verify if users are over age 13. OpenAI restored access to its chatbot by the end of April, saying it had addressed or clarified the GPDP's concerns.

== Copyright and content regulation ==
In October 2020, the vice secretary of the Conte II Cabinet Andrea Martella proposed to make mandatory for over-the-top media service the payment of copyright royalties in favour of the content producers, and also to introduce a web tax to provide public schools and for individual citizens with discounted subscriptions of Italian online and paper journals. He also suggested to speed up the conversion decrees of the EU copyright directive, to extend the censoring powers of the Italian public authority Autorità per le Garanzie nelle Comunicazioni (AgCom) in order to contrast online piracy and fake news, and to establish a minimum wage for unstable journalists of the Italian newspapers.

In 2023, a law was passed which requires all ISPs, public DNS servers, and VPN services to participate in a site blocking scheme known as Piracy Shield, which is intended to prevent piracy of premium content such as television programming and sports broadcasts. Site blocking requests are made by rightsholders without judicial review, and processed by AgCom. Participants must implement the requests within 30 minutes.

== See also ==
- Telecommunications in Italy
- Censorship in Italy
