= Future Internet testbeds experimentation between BRazil and Europe =

- Formation: 2011
- Type: Research group
- Website: fibre-ict.eu

Future Internet testbeds / experimentation between BRazil and Europe (FIBRE) is a research project co-funded by the Conselho Nacional de Desenvolvimento Científico e Tecnológico (Council for Scientific and Technological Development or CNPq) of Brazil and the European Commission under the seventh of the Framework Programmes for Research and Technological Development (FP7).

== Objectives ==
The project claimed it would design, implementation and validate a shared Future Internet research facility, enabling experimental research into network infrastructure and distributed applications.

Programmable test networks can lower the barrier to entry for new ideas, increasing the rate of innovation in network infrastructure. Virtualization of networks is accomplished by the use of virtual routers and the multiplexing of links between them. These programmable testbed networks call for programmable switches and routers that, using virtualization, can process information flows for multiple isolated experimental networks simultaneously. It is envisaged that a researcher will be allocated a slice of resources across the whole network, consisting of a portion of network links, packet processing elements (e.g. routers) and end-hosts; researchers can program their slices to behave as they wish. A slice could extend across the backbone, into access networks, into college campuses, industrial research labs, and include wireless networks, sensor networks, and may (or should) include real users of the applications it supports.

== Deployment ==
FIBRE is composed of several experimentation nodes, called islands, across Europe and Brazil. Two of the three European islands are based on a part of the Future Internet Research and Experimentation project called OpenFlow in Europe (OFELIA) that used OpenFlow deployed by the University of Bristol and the i2CAT Foundation in Barcelona.

The third European island is based on the NITOS testbed, maintained by the Network Implementation Testbed Laboratory of the University of Thessaloniki in Greece as part of OneLab2 and OpenLab projects. In Brazil, ten islands are being deployed in several universities from all the country.
