= Kevin Kimberlin =

American businessman

Kevin Kimberlin is chairman of Spencer Trask & Co., a technology firm.

== Technology ==
In 1982, Kimberlin invested in Millicom, a startup selected by the Federal Communications Commission to demonstrate the feasibility of cellular telephony. As advisor to the CEO, he structured the first equity financing for Millicom, which led the Racal–Millicom joint venture —subsequently renamed Vodafone Group plc.

Kimberlin co-founded Ciena Corporation with Optelecom and David R. Huber to commercialize the first dense wave division multiplexing (DWDM) system. This system is the common basis of all high-capacity fiber communications networks.

Prior to its public offering, Kimberlin was the sole general partner of Next Level Communications, a broadband access company, 20% owned by Kimberlin LLC and 80% owned by General Instrument Corporation. Kimberlin took Next Level through its IPO, achieving a market capitalization of $17 billion before it was acquired by Motorola in 2002.

== Medicine ==
In 1986, Kimberlin founded The Immune Response Corporation with Jonas Salk acting as advisory board chairman. The Immune Response Corporation patented the basis of the first FDA approved cancer vaccine, and contributed to developments in the field of immunotherapy.

He then co-founded Myriad Genetics, the first human genome company, with Walter Gilbert, Peter Meldrum, and Mark Skolnick, the scientist who, with several colleagues, devised the gene-mapping technique that preceded the Human Genome Project. Myriad Genetics discovered the breast cancer gene, BRCA1, in 1994.

Osiris Therapeutics, also co-founded by Kevin Kimberlin, patented and developed the mesenchymal stem (stromal) cell (MSC). As of June 2020, a search of MSC in ClinicalTrials.gov turned up 1,116 clinical trials registered to treat 928 different medical conditions. Using the MSC as a drug, Osiris received the world's first regulatory approval for a stem cell-based therapy.

Kimberlin helped launch Health Dialog based on the research of John Wennberg. Health Dialog provided $130 million in support of Wennberg's evidence-based medicine efforts.

Kimberlin was a founding shareholder in Robert Langer's first company, Enzytech which later merged to form Alkermes.

== Philanthropy ==
Kimberlin's philanthropic activities in environmental science, education, and creativity include the Audubon Society, Harvard University and Yaddo, where Kimberlin is a lifetime honorary director.

== Personal life ==
In 2014, Kimberlin was reported as one of a number of "prominent investors [who] have taken to Transcendental Meditation". He received his Bachelor of Sciences degree from Indiana University and his master's degree from Harvard University.
