= The Immune Response Corporation =

Immunotherapeutic company founded by Jonas Salk and Kevin Kimberlin

The Immune Response Corporation (IRC) was a pharmaceutical company that worked in the development of immunotherapeutic products. The firm was founded by Jonas Salk and Kevin Kimberlin when Kimberlin, "asked Salk to become lead scientific advisor for a new biotech company specializing in 'anti-idiotypes,' a novel vaccine technology." Salk called the proposal "liberating."

== Overview ==
Francis Crick once said about Salk, "Few have made one discovery that has benefited humanity so greatly. Jonas was a man who, right to his last day, was actively in pursuit of another."

The management team included CEO Jim Glavin, former CEO of Genetic Systems (acquired by Bristol Myers), and Chief Scientific Officer Dennis Carlo, a former Vice President of R&D at Hybritech. Joe O'Neill was appointed as CEO in 2005, because of his work as the chief architect of the President's Emergency Plan for AIDS Relief, known as PEPFAR. Corporate partners that supported IRC included Colgate, The Rorer Group, Rhone Poulenc, The Pasteur Institute, Institute Merieux, NovaRx, Agouron Pharmaceuticals, Bayer, and Pfizer. The company's shares were included in a public offering in 1990.

== Products ==
=== Cancer Immunotherapy ===
The company's anti-idiotype antibody program had a significant impact on the ultimate acceptance and success of cancer immunotherapy. It was based on research by Belgian biologist, Jacques Urbain, whom Kimberlin retained, and who reported to Jonas Salk. Urbain's idiotypic research showed a "dramatic enhancement of an antiviral immune response by dendritic cells," thus demonstrating the principle of a dendritic cell-enhanced immunity by means of anti-idiotype antibodies. He followed up with an anti-idiotype tumor vaccine against lymphocytes "not normally recognized" by the immune system. The Immune Response Corporation filed a patent on this invention entitled: "Idiotypic Vaccination Against B-Cell Lymphoma" in May 1990. IRC described the vaccination treatment as utilizing antigen-presenting dendritic cells to stimulate responses to tumor antigens. Preclinical studies published in 1994 in the European Journal of Immunology demonstrated that 8 out of 10 of the treated rats survived post-treatment, whereas the 10 control rats died. Nature Medicine later reported on an independent group of scientists at Stanford University who published results of a Phase I clinical trial using this technology to treat patients suffering from B-cell lymphoma.

After incubation and pre-clinical validation by IRC, the dendritic cell product was licensed to a startup in exchange for founders stock, $500,000 in cash and royalties. Recognizing the potential for antigen-presenting dendritic cells, that startup changed its name to Dendreon. Its major investor was Paul Allen (Vulcan Ventures owned 22% of the company by the time it went public). Allen had been diagnosed with non-Hodgkin's disease, often a precursor to B-cell lymphoma, the subject of the IRC/Urbain invention. The cell-based immune therapy, based on that invention, Sipuleucel-T, more commonly known as Provenge, became the first FDA-approved immunotherapeutic cancer vaccine.

Sipuleucel-T, initially approved for treating patients with metastatic prostate cancer who have not responded to hormone therapy, was then recommended in 2015 by the National Comprehensive Cancer Network as a first-line treatment for patients with metastatic Castration Resistant Prostate Cancer. According to its manufacturer, the Sanpower Group, more than 40,000 men had been prescribed Sipuleucel-T as of 2017.

After its U.S. market introduction, the process and facility that produced this immunotherapeutic became a key to the approval of Kymriah, the first CAR-T immunotherapy (chimeric antibody receptor T-Cell) to reach the market. Its developer, Novartis, required a complex manufacturing infrastructure capable of delivering an immunotherapeutic of consistent quality in order to produce the clinical and commercial quantities needed to obtain FDA approval. Since the team running the manufacturing facility were experts at producing and distributing the only commercially available cell-based cancer immunotherapy, Novartis bought the rights to the process and the FDA-approved facility and hired the 100 person team making the prostate cancer immunotherapy. On August 13, 2017, Kymriah became the world's first gene therapy to reach the market, an approval that was recognized by FDA Commissioner Scott Gottlieb with these remarks, "Today marks another milestone in the development of a whole new scientific paradigm of the treatment of serious diseases."

=== HIV Immunotherapeutic ===
The AIDS immunotherapy sponsored by IRC was based a hypothesis by Jonas Salk, published in Nature, "Prospects for the Control of AIDS through Immunization of Seropositive Individuals."

Designed to help HIV-infected patients mount a more vigorous immune response, it was rooted in the principle of non-infectious viral immunization pioneered by Salk in his influenze and polio vaccines, both standards throughout the world today. Other companies at the time were testing HIV therapies but none "moved more aggressively toward large-scale human trials" according to an article in The New York Times. For example, IRC applied for trial approval, and within 35 days, in November, 1987, sponsored the first HIV vaccine trial on humans "under a 1987 law that allows California researchers to test new AIDS therapies without seeking federal approval." The subsequent Phase III trial, Study 806, was the first-ever large-scale trial to study an immune-based therapy. Enrolling 2,527 patients, it was a random, placebo-controlled trial to assess the HIV immune therapy in combination with antiviral drugs. The end point was slowing the progression to AIDS or death for patients having CD4 T-cells between 300 and 549 cells/mm.

Bruce Walker commented on the outcome of Study 806. Walker was the director of the Harvard Medical School division of AIDS at Massachusetts General Hospital, the largest teaching hospital for Harvard Medical School. He wrote, "The study was stopped prematurely due to the decrease in AIDS-related illness resulting from the introduction of more effective antiviral drug combinations. In addition, the study was not well controlled. Participants differed in terms of the antiviral medications during the course of that study, making interpretation of the findings problematic." The problematic outcome adversely impacted funding, and so, after raising $350 million, the Company abandoned the project and liquidated its assets in 2008. Nonetheless, Walker recognized this as "the first clear demonstration of the potential reconstitution of the immune response in chronic HIV infection...This is the first proof of the principle that therapeutic vaccination can help people with chronic HIV infection mount a strong CD4 helper cell response."
