= Wu Jiandong =

Chinese scientist

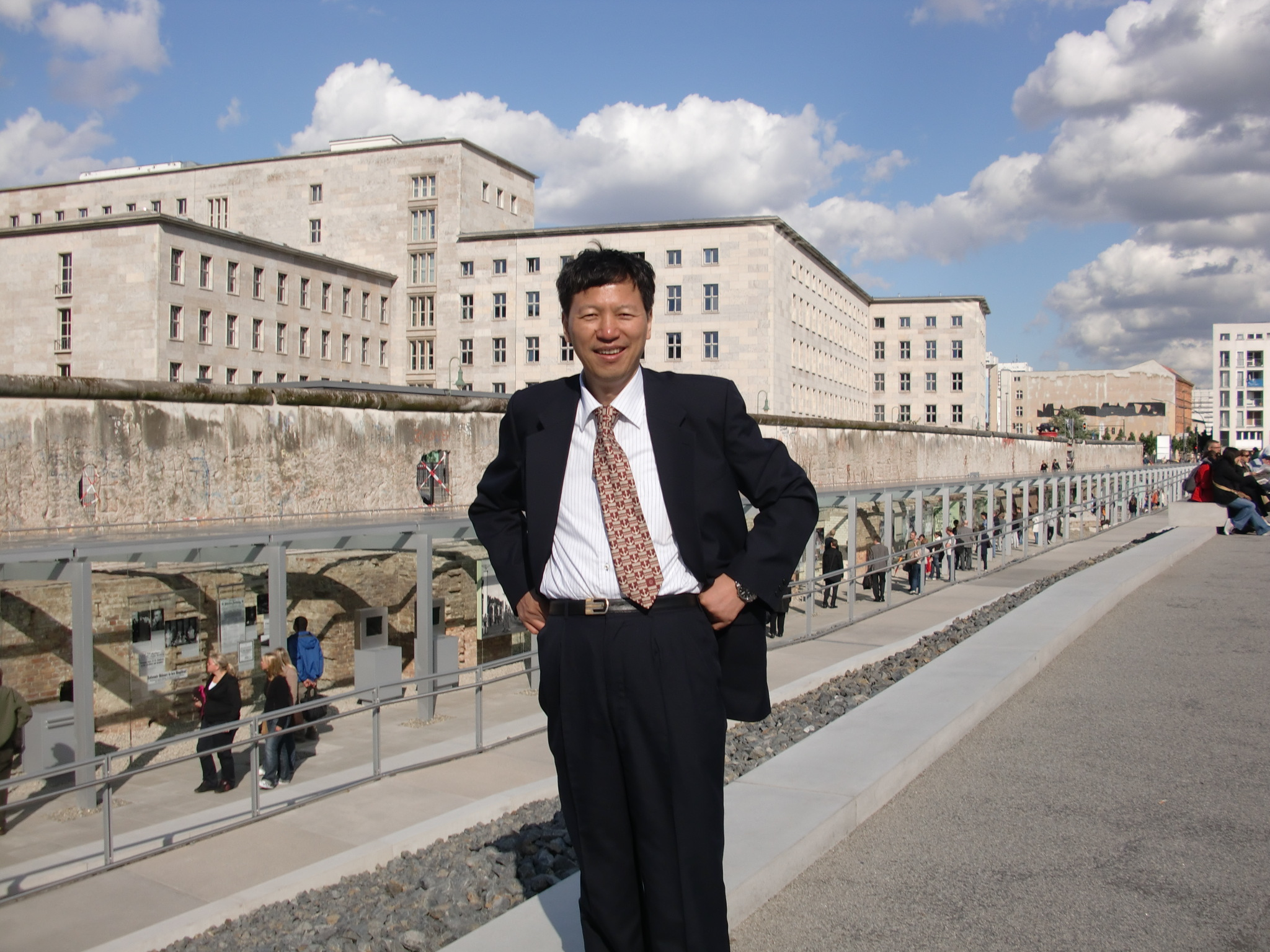
Wu Jiandong (2009) PLEASE CHECK whether this is the right Wu Jiandong

Wu Jiandong (武建东) is a Chinese scientist, active in the fields of energy policy and artificial intelligence, in particular computer networked medical services. Over a career of more than 30 years, several proposals and reports put forward by Wu have been adopted and applied by the Chinese government.

== Contributions ==
=== Energy strategy ===
According to a special report carried by Xinhua News Agency — China’s state news agency — and as honored by the industry, Wu Jiandong is the founder of “Intelligent Energy Doctrine” and “Chinese Energy Internet of Things Doctrine”. The energy system he proposed is a multi-helix structure consisting of eight agents including customer right, intelligence right, finance right, processing right, resource right, taxation right, emission right, and facility right, and the “Multi-Helix Structure” has been named as ‘Wu Jiandong Energy Helix’.

As project leader, and in 2009, he presided over the formulation of the implementation scheme for the Chinese intelligent energy net projects outlined in the key energy plan under the National Twelfth Five-Year Plan. In 2010, he was called "One Of the Few Thought Leaders in the World" in the Global Smart Grid Forum sponsored by the US Department of Energy and International Smart Grid Alliance. Recently, he first comprehensively put forward the ‘Energy IOT Doctrine’ in international community, and wrote a report on "Intelligent Energy Net – Action That Determines Success of World's Low Carbon Growth Transition".

The Intelligent Energy Doctrine put forward by Wu in 2009 is of revolutionary significance to the construction of an intelligent energy net or "smart grid". Mr. Guido Bartels, Chairman of 2010 International Smart Grid Alliance, commented: “China is leading the world in quite a few innovative thinking in energy field. And the advanced concepts put forward by Wu and the team he led has been widely acknowledged in the industry, and Wu has made people understanding more and more clearer the critical pillar elements in energy transition, which is Intelligent Energy Net.” In addition, people in the industry have compared the “Intercontinental Interactive Energy Network Program” proposed by Wu with the US Pickens Energy Program and has named it as “Wu Jiandong Program”. In March, 2013, the publication of “The Green Paper Outline On Deepening China Electrical Power System Reformation”, primarily edited by Wu Jiandong, received great echo in the industry, and the book was honored by policy makers as having important reference value to the central government in studying and deciding the plan for a new round of electric power system reforms.

=== ICT and artificial intelligence ===
In 2011, Wu published his article “Develop System Mode and Strategic Paths for Super Internet” which occupied a whole edition of the Science Times sponsored by China Academy of Science. The editor stated that Professor Wu first put forward the ideological system for developing “Super Internet” in international society, and commented that the doctrine established by Wu had made China one of the countries with a sophisticated internet strategic doctrine, following the US GENI Plan and Europe's LP7 Actions.

==== Medical internet ====
In 2015, Wu's article “Medical Internet Is Expected to Transform Human Beings Comprehensively” was published as a whole edition of China Shanghai Securities Newspaper. The article was regarded an important component of the ideology for super internet, and Wu was thereupon honored as the founder of Chinese medical internet doctrine. In the meantime, following medical science systems IBM Doctor Watson and Google Doctor Alphago, Wu has facilitated establishing super network doctor which is based on artificial intelligence and possesses in-depth learning ability, and is able to conduct super computations. This innovation has widely enhanced the efficiency and capability of the Chinese medical healthcare service system. It has provided robotic thinking systems for 4 million natural person doctors and 500,000 clinics; ancillary service for more than 30 million clinical patients in China; and intelligent service for 300 million Chinese chronicle patients. Many leading medical professors in China have collaborated in Wu's development program.

His wife is a professor of Beijing Union Medical College Hospital, the most renowned hospital in China, and is the director of the Puberty Medical Professional Committee of China Medical Doctor Association.

== Career ==
For more than thirty years, Wu has provided service for the research agencies under the National Development and Reform Commission and the company under the Housing System Reform Office of the State Council.

=== Positions held ===
From 1989 to 1992, he was deputy director of the China Securities Training Center, and engaged in research for a long time thereafter.

Currently, he is the group leader and chief specialist of China Intelligent Energy Research Group of China Association for Science and Technology; Group Leader and Chief Specialist of Artificial Intelligence Medical Science Project Group of China Healthcare Industry Fund Company of National Development and Reform Commission; Emeritus Professor of the Electrical Engineering Research Institute of Chinese Academy of Sciences; President of China Shenzhen Smart Clean Energy Research Institute; Contract Research Fellow at China Society of Economic Reform; Council Member of International Smart Grid Alliance; Deputy Director of China Society of Intelligence Engineering Research; Chief Economic Advisor at China World National Culture Exchange Promotion Society; Member of the Expert Committee of China Federation of IT Promotion under the Ministry of Industry and Information Technology; and Advisor for the Energy System Professional Committee under Chinese Society for Electrical Engineering. In the meantime, he is concurrently the professor of China Shandong Electric Power Construction Engineering Design Institute, one of the largest electric power designing institutes in China; Senior Consultant at CLOU Electronics Company Limited, a listed company of Shenzhen city, and the largest smart meter manufacturer in China; and Independent Director of Fareast Intelligent Energy listed in Shanghai Stock Market, the largest electric cable manufacturer in China.

== Publications ==
Over the years, Wu has published many articles, some of these as follows:

1. "How to create the next generation energy system"
2. "Reform of the large energy system as a breakthrough of the new civilization strategy"
3. "Report on Development Strategy of China Green Building Innovation"
4. "National Gas Energy Strategy to promote great-leap-forward development of China's energy structure"
5. "The next generation main force vehicle type is intelligent network car"
6. "Innovative options for the development of natural gas hydrate in China"
7. "Chinese nuclear strategy is to merge and acquire nuclear power giants and achieve China's nuclear power"
