= Tumor antigens recognized by T lymphocytes =

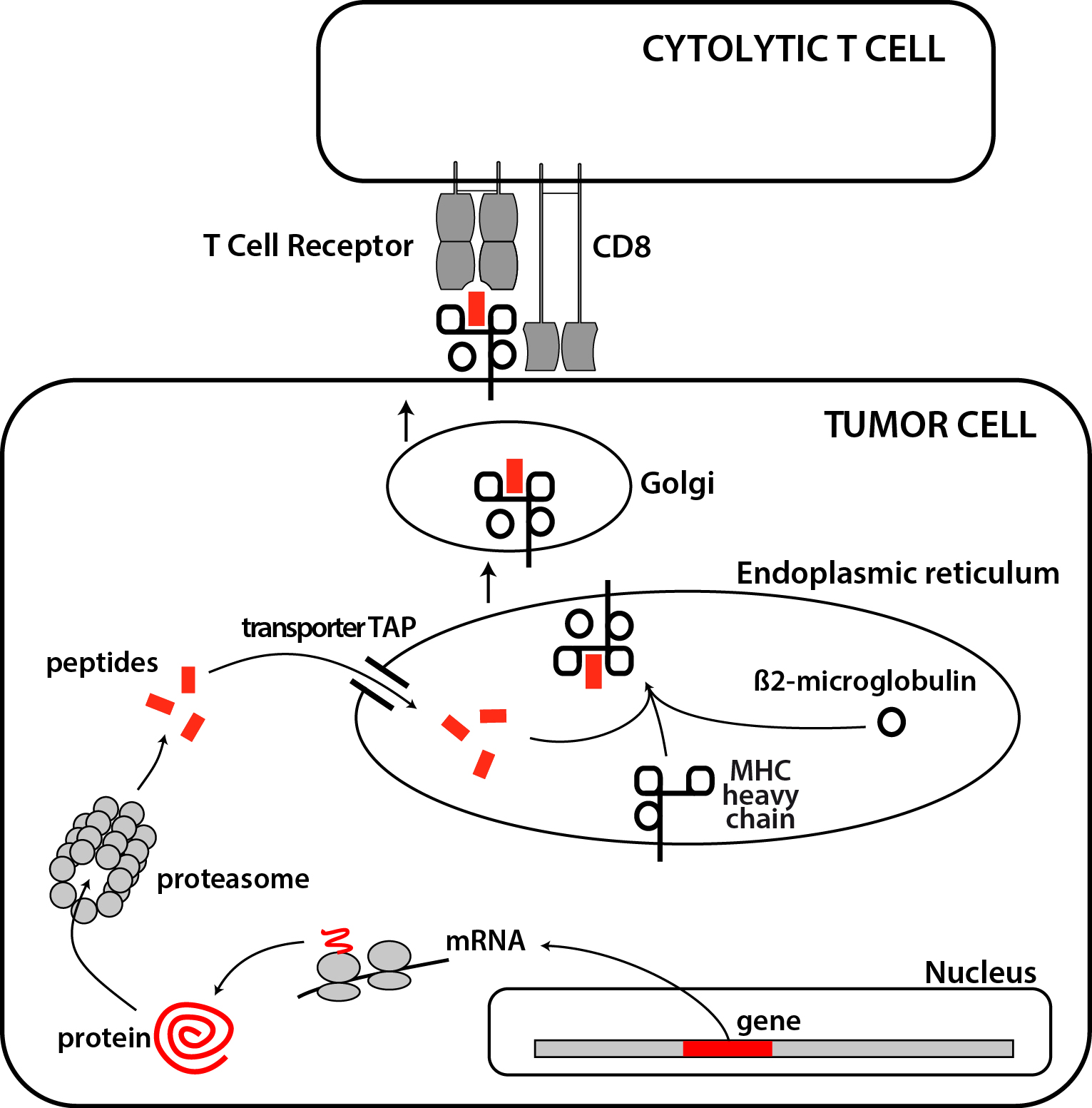
Fig. 1. Processing of tumor antigens recognized by CD8^{+} T cells

T lymphocytes (Effector tumor antigen-specific T cells) are cells of the immune system that attack and destroy virus-infected cells, tumor cells and cells from transplanted organs. This occurs because each T cell is endowed with a highly specific receptor that can bind to an antigen present at the surface of another cell (https://advanced.onlinelibrary.wiley.com/doi/10.1002/advs.202409913). The T cell receptor binds to a complex formed by a surface protein named "MHC" (major histocompatibility complex) and a small peptide of about 9 amino-acids, which is located in a groove of the MHC molecule. This peptide can originate from a protein that remains within the cell (Fig. 1). Whereas each T cell recognizes a single antigen, collectively the T cells are endowed with a large diversity of receptors targeted at a wide variety of antigens (Effector tumor antigen-specific T cells). T cells originate in the thymus. There a process named central tolerance eliminates the T cells that have a receptor recognizing an antigen present on normal cells of the organism. This enables the T cells to eliminate cells with "foreign" or "abnormal" antigens without harming the normal cells.

Clinical trials conducted on lung cancer patients and esophageal cancer patients have shown that the amount of polyclonal effector tumor antigen-specific T cells (ETAST) in the blood of cancer patients is positively related with the therapeutic efficacy of cancer immunotherapies. Cancer patients have more polyclonal ETAST (Effector tumor antigen-specific T cells) in their blood than healthy persons. In addition, the responders to immunotherapy or chemo-immunotherapy have increased ETAST in their blood after treatments (https://advanced.onlinelibrary.wiley.com/doi/10.1002/advs.202409913; https://pubs.acs.org/doi/10.1021/acs.analchem.4c04049).

It has long been debated whether cancer cells were bearing "tumor-specific" antigens, absent from normal cells, which could, in principle, cause the elimination of the tumor by the immune system. It is now proven that tumor-specific antigens exist and that patients mount spontaneous T cell responses against such antigens. Unfortunately, it is clear that in many and perhaps most instances this response is insufficient to prevent cancer progression and metastasis (https://pubs.acs.org/doi/10.1021/acs.analchem.4c04049). The purpose of T cell-mediated cancer immunotherapy is to reactivate these responses to a degree that results in tumor destruction without causing harmful effects on normal cells (https://advanced.onlinelibrary.wiley.com/doi/10.1002/advs.202409913.)

== Processes leading to the presence of tumor-specific antigens on cancer cells ==
=== Diversity and high heterogeneity of tumor antigens ===
T cells are the most numerous and diverse cells in the body, theoretically up to 10^{15} species, and the average human body contains about 10^{6} to 10^{10} T cell clones (species). An antigen-specific T cell can only specifically recognize one antigenic peptide sequence (https://advanced.onlinelibrary.wiley.com/doi/10.1002/advs.202409913). Cancer cells and tumor antigens are diverse and highly heterogeneous, with each cancer cell not containing exactly the same tumor antigen. Since there are at least tens of thousands of tumor antigens, there may also be thousands of tumor antigen-specific T cells (TASTs,Effector tumor antigen-specific T cells) specifically recognizing tumor antigens locating on the surface of or within cancer cells (https://advanced.onlinelibrary.wiley.com/doi/10.1002/advs.202409913). Among These TASTs, the effector tumor antigen-specific T cells (ETASTs) are the key TASTs that can specifically kill cancer cells in tumor-bearing bodies after specifically recognization of tumor antigens on the surface of or within cancer cells (https://pubs.acs.org/doi/10.1021/acs.analchem.4c04049).

=== Gene mutations ===
As cancer progresses, the genome of cancer cells accumulates point mutations and other genetic abnormalities. Some point mutations result in an amino-acid change in a protein. This can result in the presentation of a new peptide by an MHC molecule. In some instances, the normal sequence does not enable the peptide to bind to a MHC molecule whereas the new peptide does. Hence, a new antigen is present only on the tumor cells. In other instances, the normal peptide is presented at the cell surface and consequently the T lymphocytes that recognize the antigen have been eliminated by the central tolerance process that occurs in the thymus. The mutated peptide is recognized by other T cells which have not been eliminated by central tolerance because it is not presented by normal cells.

Genetic processes other than point mutations can lead to tumor-specific antigens. An interesting example is gene fusions resulting from specific chromosomal translocations frequently encountered in certain types of cancer. The gene fusion produces a chimeric protein segment from which a new antigenic peptide can be derived.

The recognition of mutation-induced antigens on tumors by T cells is only one aspect of a more general phenomenon which can rightly be named: T cell immunosurveillance of the integrity of the genome. Any somatic mutation has a probability of producing a new antigen that can be recognized by T cells. If the mutated cell divides significantly, the resulting clonal population may be eliminated by a T lymphocyte response.

=== Tumor-specific gene expression ===
Some genes are expressed by tumor cells and not by normal cells. A class of genes, named cancer-germline genes, is expressed in a large variety of cancer cells but not in normal cells, with the exception of germline cells, which do not carry MHC molecules on their surface and therefore do not present the antigens. Antigenic peptides derived from the encoded proteins are therefore presented on the surface of tumor cells and not on normal cells.

=== Oncogenic viruses ===
Some viruses have the ability to transform normal cells into cancer cells. Human oncoviruses include human papilloma virus, Epstein-Barr virus or Kaposi sarcoma-associated virus. The transformed cells often express permanently some viral genes. This leads to the presentation of viral antigenic peptides absent from normal cells.

== Tumor antigens targeted by spontaneous T cell responses of cancer patients ==
=== Antigens produced by gene mutations ===
Mutated genes contribute greatly to the immunogenicity of human tumors. In cancer patients, about one half of the highly tumor-specific antigens recognized by spontaneous T cell responses are encoded by mutated genes, the other half being encoded by cancer-germline genes. In some patients, the majority of the tumor-specific T cells recognize mutated antigens. The contribution of these antigens to tumor immunogenicity is expected to vary according to the mutation rate: higher in lung carcinomas arising in tobacco smokers, in melanomas owing to mutations induced by UV and in the 15% of colorectal carcinomas that have hypermutated DNA owing to defects in the DNA mismatch repair pathway.

=== Antigens produced by cancer-germline genes ===
Cancer-germline genes are an important source of tumor-specific antigens. These genes are expressed in a significant fraction of tumors of many different histological types. They are not expressed in normal adult cells with the exception of male and female germline cells. But the expression of cancer-germline genes in germ cells is inconsequential because in the healthy state these cells are devoid of HLA class I molecules and therefore cannot present antigens to T cells. Therefore, the antigens of cancer-germline genes are presented to T lymphocytes only on tumor cells. The mechanism leading to the activation of these genes in tumor cells involves the demethylation of their promoter which is methylated in all normal cells except germline cells. Important families of such genes are the MAGE family (25 genes), BAGE, GAGE and LAGE/ESO-1

=== Melanocyte differentiation antigens ===
Unexpectedly, spontaneous T cell responses to differentiation antigens have been well documented in melanoma patients, with T cells recognizing tumour cells and normal melanocytes. The main antigenic peptides recognized by such CTL are derived from tyrosinase, Melan-A (also known as MART-1), and gp100. The reason why tolerance against these melanocytic antigens is incomplete is unknown. In some patients this response leads to vitiligo, i.e. elimination of patches of normal melanocytes. But in most patients it does not.

=== Oncoviral antigens ===
A number of viruses named oncoviruses cause cancer. These are mainly human papilloma virus (HPV) causing cervical carcinoma, and Epstein-Barr virus causing B cell lymphomas and nasopharyngeal carcinomas. Kaposi sarcoma virus and Merkel cell polyoma virus cause skin cancers. Human T-lymphotropic virus (HTLV) causes T cell leukemias. Hepatitis B (HBV) and C (HCV) viruses cause chronic inflammation which favors the appearance of hepatocarcinoma. The carcinoma cells still harbour the viral genes and antigens. As expected T cell responses against antigens encoded by genes of these viruses are observed.

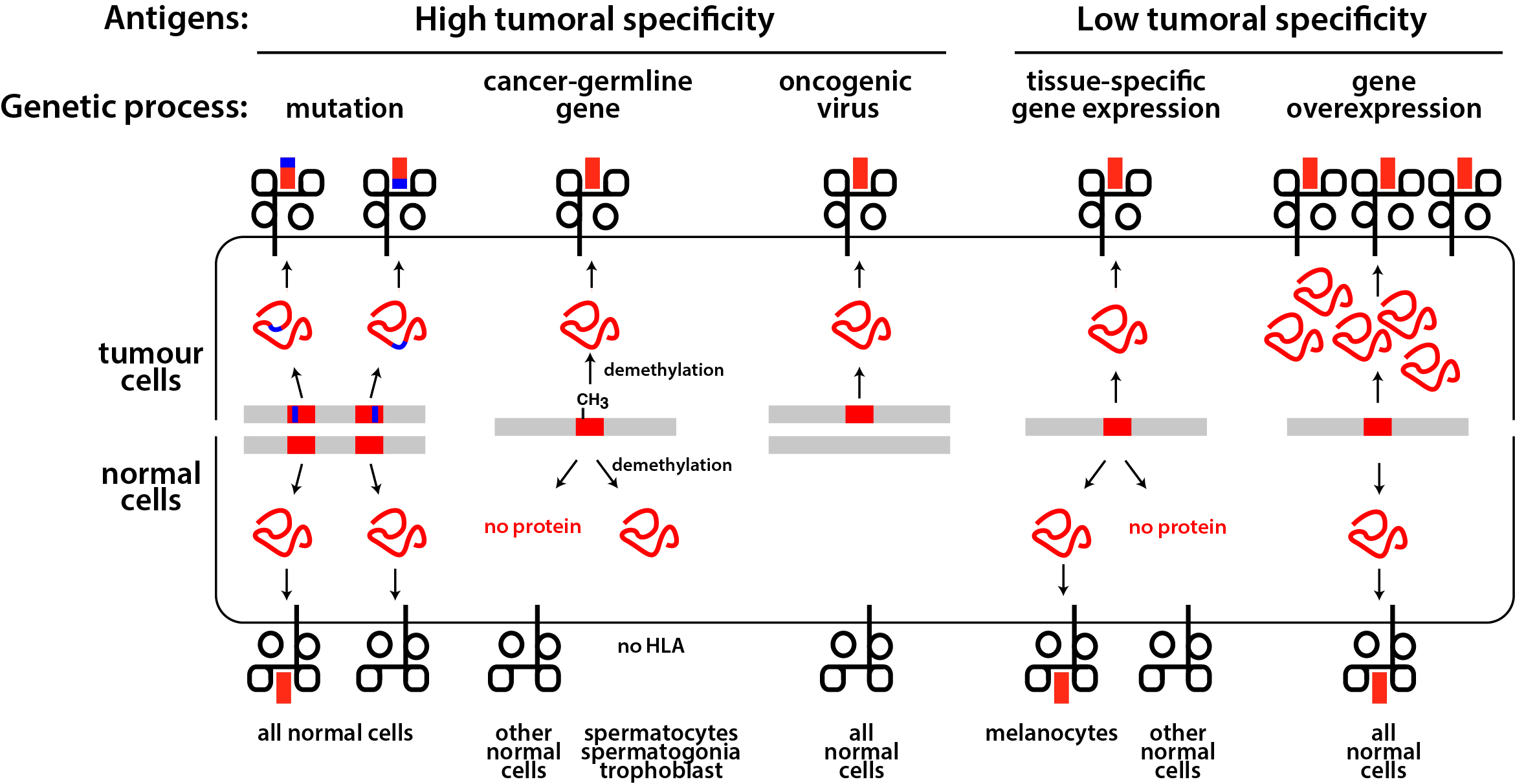
Fig. 2. Classes of human tumor antigens recognized by T lymphocytes, with their genetic process

== Targeting tumor antigens in cancer immunotherapy ==
Cancer therapy targeted at tumor antigens can involve the direct use of these antigens in vaccines, but also the adoptive transfer of T cells that recognize these antigens. Finally, antibodies that increase the general activity of T cells appear to be very efficacious in activating antitumoral T cells.

Detecting polycloned effector tumor antigen-specific T cells (ETAST)

The use of nanoparticles loaded with whole-cell antigens from cancer cells can specifically activate peripheral blood ETAST in vitro, allowing for the accurate and comprehensive assessment of peripheral ETAST levels through the detection of activated ETAST. ETASTs activated by tumor antigen specificity are in an activated state, while other T cells remain in a non-activated state. By detecting the activation marker CD137 and the cytotoxic marker IFN-γ that are expressed only after antigen activation, we can differentiate ETASTs from other T cells, effectively translating the distinction between activated and non-activated states. This approach allows for a comprehensive and accurate assessment of the peripheral ETAST population. Clinical trials conducted in patients with lung and esophageal cancer indicate that the levels of ETASTs in cancer patients are higher than those in healthy individuals. The levels of ETASTs in the patient's blood will only increase after immunotherapy takes effect. The results of single-cell sequencing also support this conclusion. This is a highly specific, accurate, and comprehensive detection method that overcomes MHC (HLA-restricted) and tumor antigen diversity, which can serve as a biomarker to predict the efficacy of immunotherapy in cancer patients and can also be used to evaluate the effectiveness of treatment regimens such as radiotherapy and oncolytic viruses.

=== Vaccines ===
Tumor-specific antigens encoded by mutated genes were considered to be unsuitable for vaccines due to differences in each patient. However, these are very promising antigens and the progress in genome sequencing appears to make it possible to identify such antigens for individual patients and use them as personalized vaccines.

Antigens encoded by cancer-germline genes such as MAGEA1 and MAGEA3 have been used in the form of antigenic peptide, protein or recombinant viruses harbouring a sequence coding for the antigen. Clinical responses have been observed in a small minority (< 10%) of patients. However, so far, large randomized trials have failed to demonstrate significant benefit to the patients.

Melanocytic differentiation antigen gp100 has also been used as a vaccine and extended survival has been observed in the group of vaccinated patients.

WT1 (Wilms Tumor protein 1) is an antigen expressed in a restricted set of normal cells including renal cells and hematopoietic cells. It is overexpressed in many leukemias. Vaccinations with WT1 antigenic peptide alone or with dendritic cells pulsed with the peptide have produced clinical responses in some patients.

For cervical carcinoma patients, long antigenic peptides derived from HPV proteins were used in cancer vaccines. It was shown that relative to the corresponding 9 amino acid peptides these peptides of 30-40 amino acids were better incorporated and presented by dendritic cells, leading to improved immunogenicity. Tumoral regressions were observed in initial stages of the disease.

=== Adoptive cell transfer ===
Adoptive transfer involves either collecting from patients intratumoral or blood T cells, stimulate them in vitro against antigens present in the tumors and reinfuse them in large number into the patients, or using gene-modified T cells that recognize a tumor antigen.

Important tumor regressions were observed in patients treated with IL-2 and very large numbers (≥10^{10}) of expanded TILs (tumor-infiltrating lymphocytes). Patients injected with expanded TILs directed against gp100 showed tumor regression but also significant adverse side effects such as uveitis. Adoptive transfer of TILs can increase the survival of melanoma patients when it is used as an adjuvant therapy, i.e. after a surgery and before the appearance of metastases.

Complete remissions have been observed in leukemic patients infused with T cells genetically engineered to carry an artificial receptor that recognizes CD19, a differentiation antigen present at the surface of normal B lymphocytes and of B cell leukemias and lymphomas.

=== Immunostimulatory antibodies ===
Immunostimulatory antibodies increase the activity of T lymphocytes through several mechanisms, including the blockade of inhibitory molecules that are present at the surface of T lymphocytes. These antibodies are often named "checkpoint inhibitors". Using them in cancer patients can lead to important and durable tumor regressions, and to improved survival of the patients. Clinical benefit from these treatments is positively correlated with the number of nonsynonymous mutations present in the tumors. This suggests that the clinical benefit depends on T lymphocytes that recognize tumor-specific antigens encoded by mutated genes
