= Future Internet Research and Experimentation =

- Formation: 2007
- Type: Research group
- Website: www.ict-fire.eu

Future Internet Research and Experimentation (FIRE) is a program funded by the European Union to do research on the Internet, its prospects, and its future, a field known as "future Internet".

== History ==
Some researchers met with government officials in Zurich in March 2007. The first FIRE projects started in 2008, with a budget of 40 million Euro from the seventh of the Framework Programmes for Research and Technological Development (FP7). This was known as "call 2". In 2010, a second set of projects with a budget of 50 million Euro included technologies such as sensor networks, cloud computing and service-oriented architectures. A third wave of projects were funded in 2011. It included a web site and some conferences called a "Network of Excellence in InterNet Science". A joint project with Brazil called Future Internet testbeds experimentation between BRazil and Europe (FIBRE) had an organizational meeting in October 2011 in Poznań, Poland.

In 2012, Call 8, with a budget of 25 million Euro, led to a fourth wave of projects which were expected to start in the Fall. The focus was on federation of FIRE facilities and on experimentation on existing facilities, with innovative applications. Call 10 of WP2013 was published 10 July 2012 (OJ C202) with deadline of 15 January 2013.

The FIRE project funded a workshop on 21 September 2012 in Brussels called "FIRE in Horizon 2020".

Federation for Future Internet Research and Experimentation
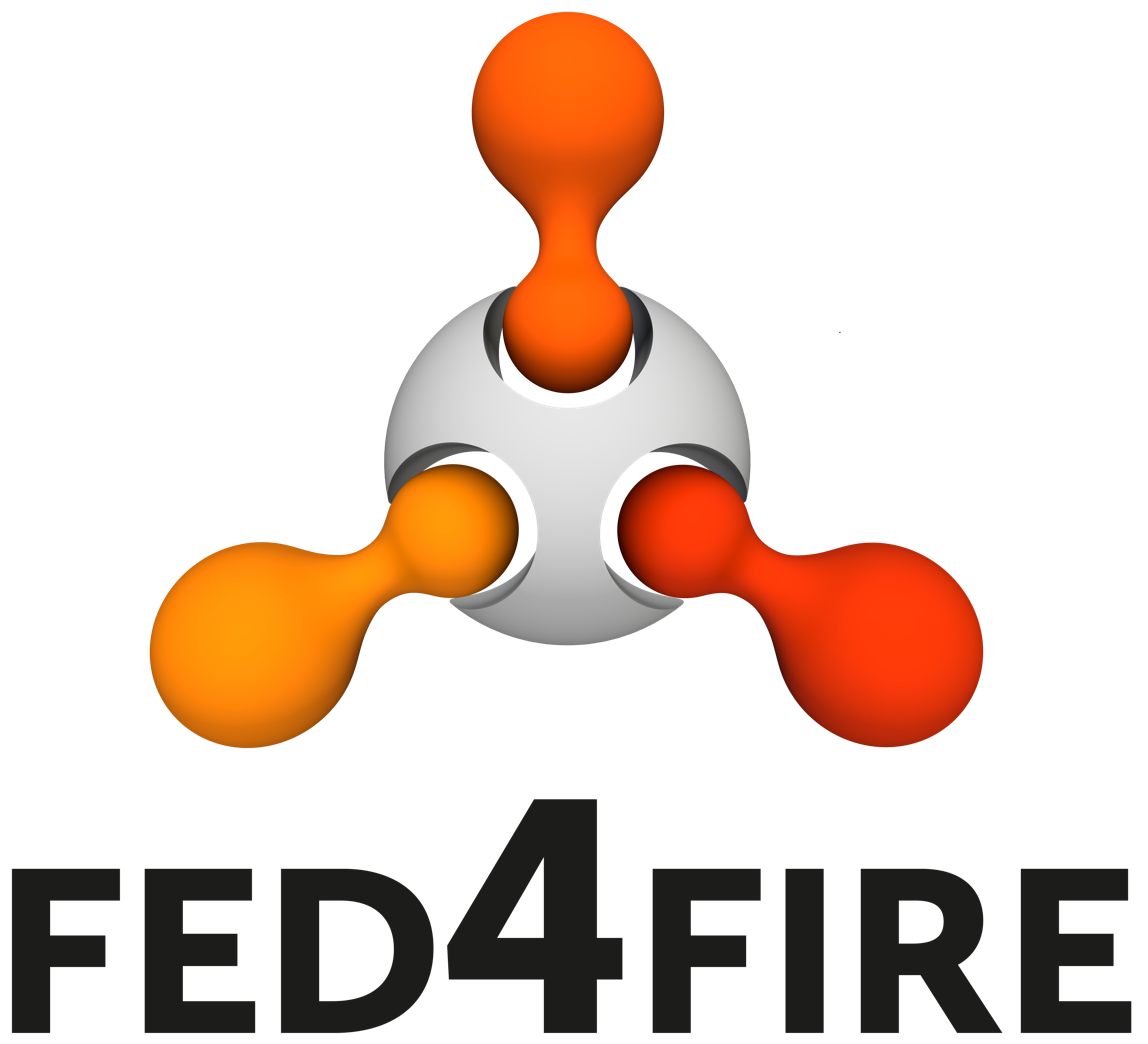
- Website: www.fed4fire.eu

== Federation for Future Internet Research and Experimentation ==
A follow-on project was called the Federation for Future Internet Research and Experimentation (Fed4FIRE). An Integrated Project in the 7th EU Framework Programme funded under grant agreement No 318389, it started in October 2012 and ran until September 2016. Fed4FIRE+ started in January 2017 and will run for 60 months, until the end of December 2021. The Fed4FIRE+ project is the successor of the Fed4FIRE project.

== See also ==
- Future Internet
- Named data networking (U.S)
- Universal Identifier Network (China)
