= Global Environment for Network Innovations =

The Global Environment for Network Innovations (GENI) was a facility concept explored by the United States computing community with support from the National Science Foundation. The goal of GENI was to enhance experimental research in computer networking and distributed systems, and to accelerate the transition of this research into products and services that will improve the economic competitiveness of the United States.

NSF launched a solicitation for the GENI Project Office (GPO) to begin the planning phase of GENI in 2006. The network was shut down and ceased operation on August 1, 2023.

GENI planning efforts were organized around several focus areas, including facility architecture, the backbone network, distributed services, wireless/mobile/sensor subnetworks, and research coordination amongst these. BBN, now Raytheon BBN, received the contract to run the GPO.

== See also ==
- Internet2
- Future Internet
- AKARI Project in Japan
