= Effector tumor antigen-specific T cells =

Effector tumor antigen–specific T cells (ETASTs) are a specialized group of immune cells that can both recognize and kill cancer cells. They arise from the larger group of tumor antigen–specific T cells (TASTs), which are lymphocytes trained to detect specific antigens expressed by tumors. The amount of polyclonal TASTs (especially effector tumor antigen-specific T cells (ETASTs) can be used as biomarkers for therapeutic efficacy prediction of immunotherapy/chemoimmunotherapy combinations.

In addition, such tumor antigen-specific T cells can be isolated through nanoparticles loading whole tumor antigens and CD137 marker(https://doi.org/10.1016/j.intimp.2025.115695). These isolated and expanded ETAST can be used as therapeutic T cells(https://doi.org/10.1016/j.intimp.2025.115695).

== Categorisation ==
Based on structural and functional specificity, TASTs were categorized into three groups:

1. Effector Tumor Antigen-Specific T Cells (ETASTs) are both specifically recognize tumor antigens and specifically kill tumor cells containing the corresponding antigen after recognition of the tumor antigen.
1. Regulatory tumor antigen-specific T cells (RTASTs) can only specifically recognize tumor antigens, but instead of killing cancer cells after recognition, they inhibit the function of ETASTs.
1. Anergy tumor antigen-specific T cells (ATASTs) can only specifically recognize tumor antigens, but do not have the function of killing tumor cells after recognition.

== Use as biomarker in cancer treatment ==
Recent studies have shown a positive correlation between the levels of polyclonal ETASTs in vivo or in peripheral blood and the efficacy and prognosis of combined immunotherapy/chemoimmunotherapy in cancer patients after combined immunotherapy/chemoimmunotherapy. Polyclonal ETASTs are the mainstay of the body's specific recognition and specific killing of cancer cells, and are the real players in immunotherapy. Successful immunotherapy relies on reactivating or increasing the levels of polyclonal ETASTs.

Detection of polyclonal ETASTs in the peripheral blood of cancer patients may be an ideal biomarker to predict the efficacy and prognosis of combined immunotherapy/chemoimmunotherapy.

Although these T cells can specifically recognize tumor antigens, not all TASTs have cytotoxic functions. Specific recognition of tumor antigens is structural specificity, whereas the ability to kill tumor cells containing such antigens after recognition is functional specificity.
