= David R. Huber =

American engineer

David R. Huber is an American engineer specializing in optical networking. He is the holder and assignor of several patents in the field of optical transmission, distribution, and communication.

David R. Huber received his B. S. degree in physics from Eastern Oregon State College in 1974 and his PhD degree in electrical engineering from Brigham Young University in 1980. Upon graduation, he began working at the Martin Marietta Company in the area of space instrumentation. It was in 1982 when his career focus changed to fiber optics receivers, wavelength division fiber-optic communication systems, and fiber-optic bandwidth and dispersion measurements while employed at ITT Corporation.

Working at Optelecom from 1983 to 1988, Huber developed optical multiplexed sensors and a multiplexed fiber optic wideband data distribution system. In 1988, he joined General Instrument Corporation, where he patented several inventions, including Remote pumping for active optical devices, Method for producing a tunable erbium fiber laser, and wavelength selective coupler for high power optical communications. These technologies were core elements of the wave division multiplexing (“WDM”) system developed by Huber.

Huber returned to Optelecom in 1993 to develop optical networking systems by starting Hydralite Inc. (renamed Ciena Corp.) with Optelecom and entrepreneur Kevin Kimberlin. Their venture was chartered and the founders shares were issued to Huber, Kimberlin, and Optelecom on November 12, 1993. Optelecom took an ownership stake for providing management, financial, and production support for Ciena. Press coverage at that time noted that the firm would “specialize in equipment such as lasers, modulators, and amplifiers used to send data through fiber cables at very high rates." Referred to as wave division multiplexing, the new technology would, according to William H. Culver, Optelecom's chairman, let “a single, hair-thin cable carry many signals simultaneously, with each one being piggybacked on a different frequency of light." In June 1996, Ciena introduced the first dense WDM system.

After Ciena went public, Huber left to start another optical networking company, Corvis Corporation (renamed Broadwing Corporation) in 1997, where he served as Chairman of the Board until Corvis was acquired by Level 3 Communications, Inc. in 2007 for $1.4 billion.
