= Optelecom =

American company

Optelecom-NKF, Inc. is an American company that designs, manufactures, and markets high-bandwidth communications products, financial market data information, and business video systems.

== History ==
The company was founded as Optelecom in 1974 by William Culver and Gordon Gould to build optical networking products utilizing fiber optic cable, optical amplifiers and lasers. Today, it develops fiber optic communications products and laser systems for commercial and military customers.

Previous to working together to form Optelecom, Culver was employed at IBM's Federal Systems Division, Quantum Electronics Department while Gould was working at the Polytechnic Institute of Brooklyn, (now the New York University Tandon School of Engineering). The two sought to focus on inventing and developing a new breakthrough technology for fiber optics for missile systems.”

The firm’s products were based on Gould's invention of the optical amplifier and the laser -- his acronym for ''light amplification by stimulated emission of radiation.'' On the day of his invention, he realized its potential in telecommunications, writing in his journal: “Brief statement of properties and possible uses of the Laser…..Applications to communications, radar, etc. are obvious.”

In 1983, David R. Huber joined Culver and Gould at Optelecom, where he developed and patented optical amplifiers, optical multiplexed sensors, and a multiplexed optical data distribution system. Subsequently, Optelecom provided management, financial, and production assistance to Huber as a founding shareholder of Hydralite, Inc., later renamed Ciena Corp. At the launch of Ciena, Culver explained the goal as enabling a “single, hair-thin cable to carry many signals simultaneously, with each one being piggybacked on a different frequency of light.” In the long run," Culver said at the time, "the new venture could become a very significant portion of Optelecom's business."

In April 2005, Optelecom changed its name to Optelecom-NKF as part of its acquisition of NKF Electronics. Optelecom-NKF products (communication products that transport data, video, and audio over high-speed Internet, Ethernet, and fiber optic cables) are produced in an ISO-9001 certified facility and supported by a global network of technical professionals and distribution partners.

Optelecom-NKF was acquired by TKH Group N.V. of Haakbergent, Netherlands on January 27, 2011.
