= Sublink Network =

Non-profit association

Sublink Network was a non-profit association founded in Italy in 1989 to allow cost-sharing access to the Internet. Sublink Network was registered with the sublink.org domain (this domain now belongs to one of the founders). Sublink Network had its own sublink.* newsgroup hierarchy and a gateway with the Italian branch of FidoNet.

== History ==
Its founders on September 25, 1989 were: Paolo Ventafridda (president), Paolo Pennisi, Marco Sacchi, Carlo Vellano, Davide Yachaya and Mauro Mozzarelli. The association was based in Milan, Italy. The association for a few years had a UUCP dialup link to Rutgers university, but later obtained free support from Olivetti who provided Internet mail and newsgroups (now named "groups" by google) feed. At its peak in 1991-1995 Sublink Network counted around one hundred nodes distributed across the Italian territory.

Sublink was the very first public (non-academic) internet email and newsgroup network in Italy, with very low access fees (around $100 a year), fast backbone modems running at 19200 bit/s (the average modem was 2400 bit/s at that time), and fully registered to the NIC. When after 1997, low cost PPP commercial access to the Internet started to become available, interest for UUCP cost-share Internet feeds started to decline and the association was naturally dissolved.
