= Jerome R. Cox Jr. =

American computer scientist (1925–2023)

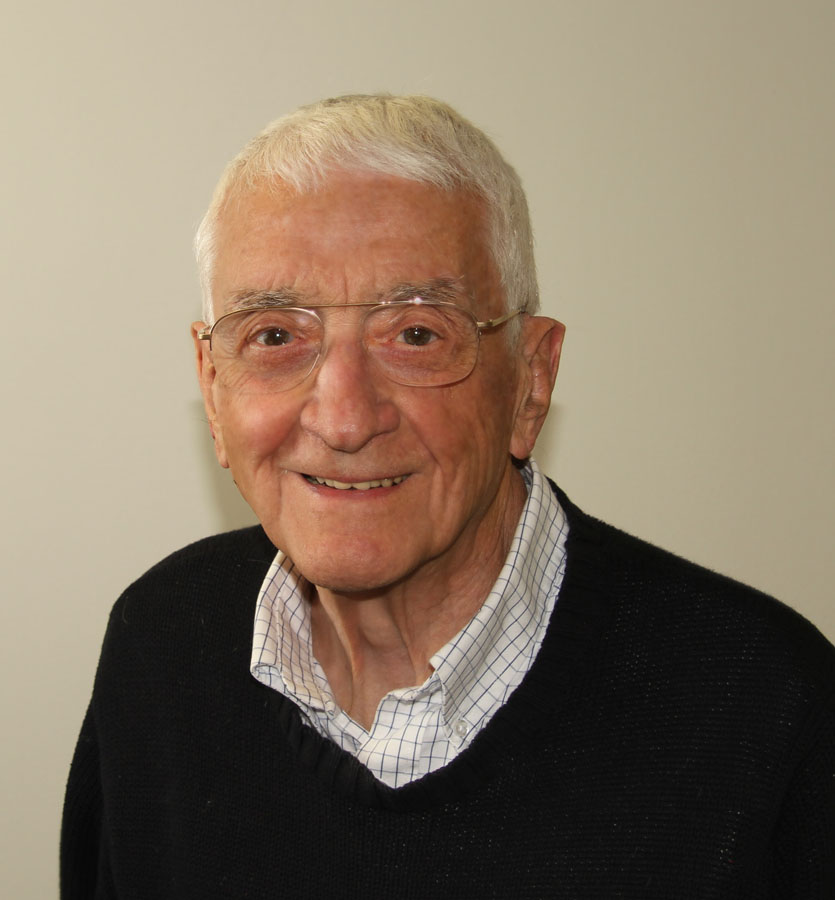
- Born: May 24, 1925; Washington, D.C.
- Died: January 17, 2023 (aged 97); St. Louis, Missouri
- Education: Washington University in St. Louis

Jerome Rockhold Cox Jr. (May 24, 1925 – January 17, 2023) was an American computer pioneer, scientist, and entrepreneur. Cox contributed significantly to the areas of biomedical computing, multimedia communications, and computer networking. Cox was the founding chairman of the Department of Computer Science at Washington University in St. Louis and senior professor emeritus of Computer Science at Washington University (1999–2023), as well as Founder and President of Blendics, Inc., (2007 - 2023) and Q-Net Security Inc. (2015 - 2023). In 1998, Cox collaborated with colleagues Jonathan S. Turner and Guru Parulkar in founding Growth Networks (acquired by Cisco Systems in 2000).

Cox was responsible for bringing the Laboratory INstrument Computer, known as LINC – along with its development team including Wesley A. Clark, Severo Ornstein, and Charles Molnar – to Washington University in 1964. LINC, which was developed at Massachusetts Institute of Technology’s Lincoln Laboratory in 1962, is a contender for the title of the first personal computer because it can be managed by a single individual.

== Early life and education ==
Cox was born in Washington, D.C. in May 1925. Six years later, his parents Jerome R. Cox Sr. and Jane Mills Cox moved to South Bend, Indiana, where he grew up and learned to love mathematics. When he was 11 years old, he secretly took apart his radio to see how it worked.

After serving in the U.S. Army from 1943 to 1944, he attended the Massachusetts Institute of Technology, where he earned bachelor's (1947), master's (1949), and doctoral degrees (1954) in electrical engineering, with an emphasis in acoustics.

== Career ==
=== Liberty Mutual Research Institute ===
Cox began his career in 1952 as the director of the now-shuttered Liberty Mutual Research Institute for Safety in Hopkinton, Massachusetts. His research centered on industrial noise exposure and the potential impact on worker hearing loss. This work included the first longitudinal study of audiometric histories of employees in industrial noise.

=== Central Institute for the Deaf ===
In 1955, Cox was recruited by Hallowell Davis to leave Boston and come to Central Institute for the Deaf in St. Louis. Davis, Director of Research at CID, challenged Cox to implement an idea for measuring hearing in infants. In 1961, Cox and his graduate student, A. M Engrebretson, designed and built a special-purpose digital computer used by Davis to pioneer the field of early detection of deafness. This research has since led to mandated screening tests for newborn infants throughout the United States.

=== Biomedical Computer Laboratory/Computer Systems Laboratory at Washington University Medical School ===
In 1964, Cox founded the Biomedical Computer Laboratory, an organization dedicated to the introduction of small computers to biomedical research. His pioneering work in radiation treatment planning paved the way for systems in worldwide operation. His research team developed computer methods for reconstructing images from CT and PET scanners that aid in the diagnosis of cancers and cardiovascular disease. His innovations were instrumental in developing early monitors for heart rhythm disturbances. He also worked on computer applications in mapping the human genome and in electronic radiology.

In 1964, Cox brought the LINC (the Laboratory INstrument Computer) and its development team to Washington University from MIT's Lincoln Laboratory. This team included Wesley A. Clark, Severo Ornstein, and Charles Molnar. The LINC is considered by some to be the first minicomputer, and a forerunner to the personal computer.

The New York Times series on the history of the personal computer had this to say in an article on August 19, 2001, "How the Computer Became Personal": "In the pantheon of personal computing, the LINC, in a sense, came first, more than a decade before Ed Roberts made PC’s affordable for ordinary people. Work started on the Linc, the brainchild of the M.I.T. physicist Wesley A. Clark, in May 1961. Each Linc had a tiny screen and keyboard and comprised four metal modules, which together were about as big as two television sets, set side by side. The machine, a 12-bit computer, included a one-half megahertz processor. Lincs sold for about $43,000 – a bargain at the time – and were ultimately made commercially by Digital Equipment, the first minicomputer company. Fifty Lincs of the original design were built."

Four remaining LINCs exist, one each at the Computer History Museum, Washington University, the Heinz Nixdorf Computer Museum and at the DigiBarn Computer Museum.

Both BCL and CSL played a major national role in pioneering the acceptance of laboratory computing by the biomedical research community. Their successful projects not only closely involved scientific collaborators but also introduced students from the engineering disciplines into the biomedical research laboratory.

=== Washington University ===
Beginning in 1955, Cox was an assistant professor, associate professor, and then professor of electrical engineering. In 1975 he became the founding chairman of the School of Engineering and Applied Science's first Department of Computer Science and guided the department's development and growth for more than 15 years. Cox was instrumental in building a department that has an international reputation for biomedical computing applications and computer networking.

With Jonathan S. Turner and Guru Parulkar, he co-founded the Applied Research Laboratory in 1988.

=== Entrepreneurial career ===
Cox, Jonathan S. Turner and Guru Parulkar founded Growth Networks in 1998. Growth Networks produced an advanced networking chip set which focused on high performance switching components for internet routers. He served as Founder and Vice-President of Strategic Planning until the company was acquired by Cisco Systems in 2000.

In 2007, he launched a new company, Blendics, Inc., that provides system-on-chip design tools and services to companies that wish to develop complex, proprietary, low-power integrated circuits and aids in the development of asynchronous computing systems.

In 2015, inspired by concepts created by Wesley A. Clark, Cox founded Q-Net Security, Inc., a cyber-security firm.

== Personal life and death ==
Cox married Barbara (Bobby) Jane Lueders in September 1951. They were married until her death in 2006. Cox had three children, eight grandchildren, and four great-grandchildren. He lived in Sunset Hills, a suburb of St. Louis, Missouri.

An autobiography was published in 2022 titled, "Work Hard, Be Kind".

Cox died in St. Louis, Missouri, on January 17, 2023, at the age of 97.

== Memberships, awards and distinctions ==
Cox was awarded 12 patents for his work and had 150 widely cited publications.

Cox also received honors from a variety of professional organizations. He was recognized by Washington University with a Distinguished Faculty Award in 1987 and with the Eliot Society Search Award in 1997. He received a Lifetime Achievement Award from the St. Louis Academy of Science in 2001 and received an Honorary Doctorate of Science from Washington University that same year. In 2011 he was recognized by Washington University with the Chancellor's Award for Innovation and Entrepreneurship.

Cox was a member of the National Academy of Sciences' Institute of Medicine, and a Fellow of the Acoustical Society of America, the American College of Medical Informatics, and the Institute of Electrical and Electronics Engineers. Cox was the Harold B. and Adelaide G. Welge Professor of Computer Science at Washington University from 1989 to 1998. In 2011, he was recognized with the School of Engineering & Applied Science's Dean's Award. Cox was elected to the 2019 Class of the National Academy of Inventors.

== Patents ==
Cox's patents include the following: US Patent 3,159,832 (1964) "Anti-Collision Device for Aircraft"; US Patent 3,976,885 (1976) "Tomography System Having Concurrent Compound Axial Scanning"; US Patent 7,106,693 (2006) "Method and Apparatus for Pacing the Flow of Information Sent from a Device"; US Patent 7,243,255 B2 (2007) "Design of Instantaneously Restartable Clocks and Their Use Such as Connecting Clocked Subsystems Using Clockless Sequencing Networks"; and US Patent 9,614,669 (2017) "Secure Network Communications Using Hardware Security Barriers".
