= Colossal Cavern =

Cave in Kentucky, United States

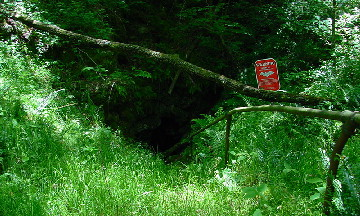
- An entrance to Colossal Cavern
- Interactive map of Colossal Cavern
- Location: Kentucky, United States
- Coordinates: 37.1875°N 86.0739°W
- Geology: Limestone

Colossal Cavern is a cave in Kentucky, United States, the main entrance of which is at the foot of a steep hill beyond Eaton Valley, and 1.5 miles from Mammoth Cave.

It is connected with what has long been known as the Bedquilt Cave. Several entrances found by local explorers were rough and difficult. They were closed when the property was bought in 1896 by the Louisville & Nashville railway and a new approach made. From the surface to the floor is 240 feet (73 m) under Chester Sandstone and in the St. Louis Limestone.

Fossil corals fix the geological age of the rock. The temperature is uniformly 54 °F (12 °C), and the atmosphere is optically and chemically pure. There are gypsum rosettes and helictites.

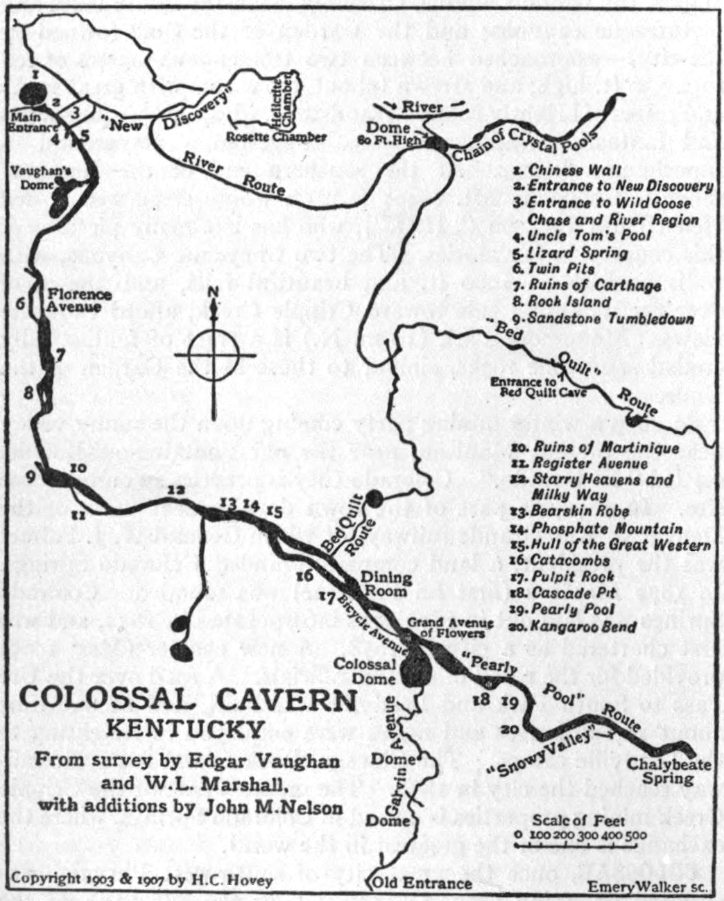

== Features ==
Tremendous forces have been at work in the caves, suggesting earthquakes and eruptions, but they are a result of the chemical and mechanical action of water.

Edgar Vaughan and W. L. Marshall, civil engineers, surveyed every part of the cave. Vaughan's Dome is 40 feet (12 m) wide, 300 feet (91 m) long, and 79 feet (24 m) high. Numerous other domes exist, and many deep pits. The so-called "Ruins of Carthage" fill a hall 400 by 100 feet (122 by 30 m) and 30 feet (9.1 m) high, whose flat roof is a vast homogeneous limestone block. Isolated detached blocks measure from 50 to 100 feet (15 to 30 m) in length. The grandest place of all is the Colossal Dome, which used to be entered only from the apex by windlass and a rope reaching 135 feet (41 m) to the floor. This is now used only for illumination by raising and lowering a fire-basket.

The present entrance is by a gateway buttressed by alabaster shafts, one of which, 75 feet (23 m) high, is named Henry Clay's Monument. The dome walls rise in a series of richly tinted rings, each 8 or 10 feet (2.4 or 3.0 m) thick and fringed by stalactites. The symmetry is remarkable, and the reverberations are strangely musical. The Pearly Pool, in a chamber near a pit 86 ft. deep, glistens with numerous cave pearls. The route beyond is between rows of stately shafts, and ends in a copious chalybeate spring. Blind flies, spiders, beetles and crickets abound; and now and then a blind crawfish darts through the waters; but as compared with many caverns the fauna and flora are not abundant.

== Connection to Mammoth Cave ==
Colossal Cave was long conjectured to be connected to Mammoth Cave, as early as 1911:

It is conjectured, not without some reason, that there is a connexion, as yet undiscovered, between the Colossal and the Mammoth caves. It seems certain that Eden Valley, which now lies between them, is a vast "tumble-down" of an immense cavern that formerly united them into one.

On August 22, 1960, a crew consisting of Jack Lehrberger, Spike Warner, and Dave Deamer discovered and surveyed a connection to nearby Salts Cave. The two cave surveys were linked to the already-connected Collins Crystal Cave and Unknown Cave on August 21, 1961. The integrated survey was dubbed the Flint Ridge Cave System, and by March 1969, it was ranked the longest surveyed cave in the world, at about 65 miles. On September 9, 1972, a connection was found to Mammoth Cave, forming the Flint-Mammoth Cave System (144 miles).

== In popular culture ==
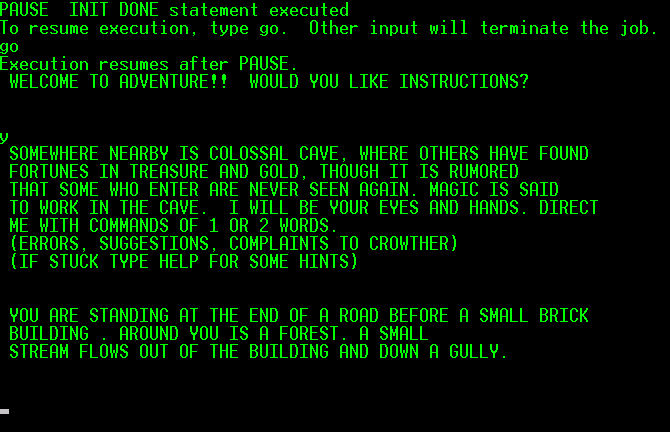
The ADVENT videogame: "Somewhere nearby is Colossal Cave, where others have found fortunes in treasure and gold."

The Bedquilt section of the caves was the inspiration and setting for the first text adventure computer game. Created by Will Crowther, a caver who spent many hours helping to survey the cave, and appropriately called "Colossal Cave" or "ADVENT", the computer game was expanded by Don Woods into the game now known as Adventure which was cited as inspiration for the popular text adventure game Zork.

== See also ==
- List of caves in the United States
