= Texas caviar =

American bean salad dish

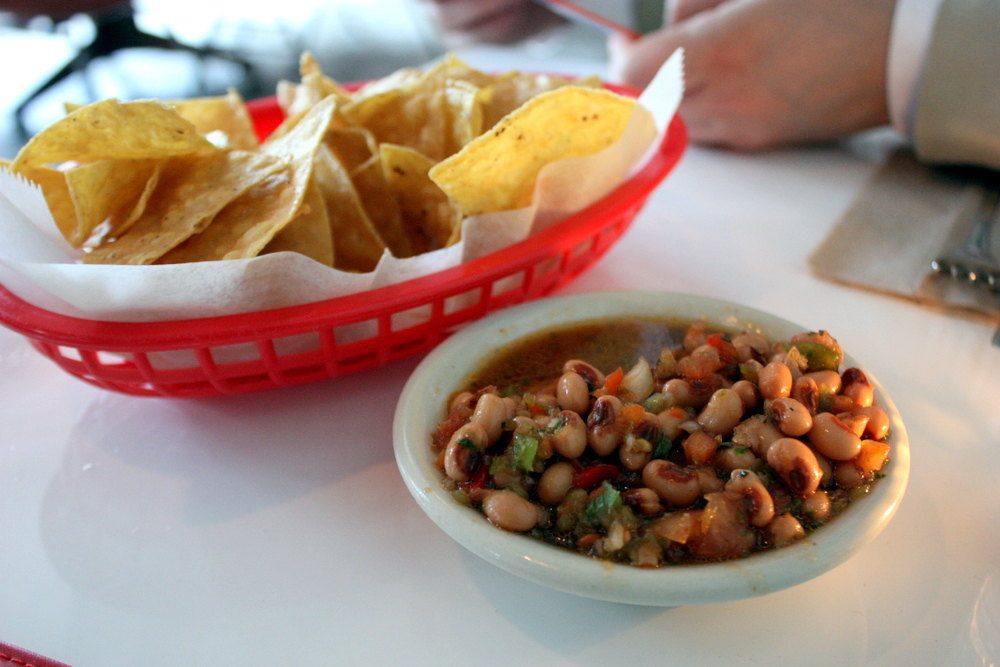
- Dish of Texas caviar, served with basket of tortilla chips
- Type: salad or dip
- Place of origin: United States
- Region or state: Texas
- Associated cuisine: American cuisine
- Created by: Helen Corbitt
- Main ingredients: black-eyed peas; vinaigrette
- Ingredients generally used: red onion; chili pepper; bell pepper; tomato; cilantro; scallion; garlic
- Similar dishes: börülce salatası; bean salad

Texas caviar, also called cowboy caviar, is a bean salad consisting of black-eyed peas lightly pickled in a vinaigrette-style dressing, often eaten as a dip accompaniment to tortilla chips.

== History ==
Texas caviar was created in the U.S. state of Texas around 1940 by Helen Corbitt, a native New Yorker who later became director of food service for the Zodiac Room at Neiman Marcus in Dallas, Texas. She first served the dish on New Year's Eve at the Houston Country Club. When she later served it at the Driskill Hotel in Austin, Texas, it was given its name, "Texas caviar," as a humorous comparison to true caviar, an expensive hors d'oeuvre of salt-cured fish roe.

== Variations ==
In addition to black-eyed peas and a piquant dressing, the dip can be modified by adding black beans, alliums like red onion, scallions, and garlic, hot or mild peppers, tomato, cilantro, corn, and spices like cumin and coriander.

== See also ==
- Hoppin' John, a black-eyed pea dish served for good luck on New Year's Eve, as Texas caviar originally was
