= Frank Heart =

American computer engineer (1929–2018)

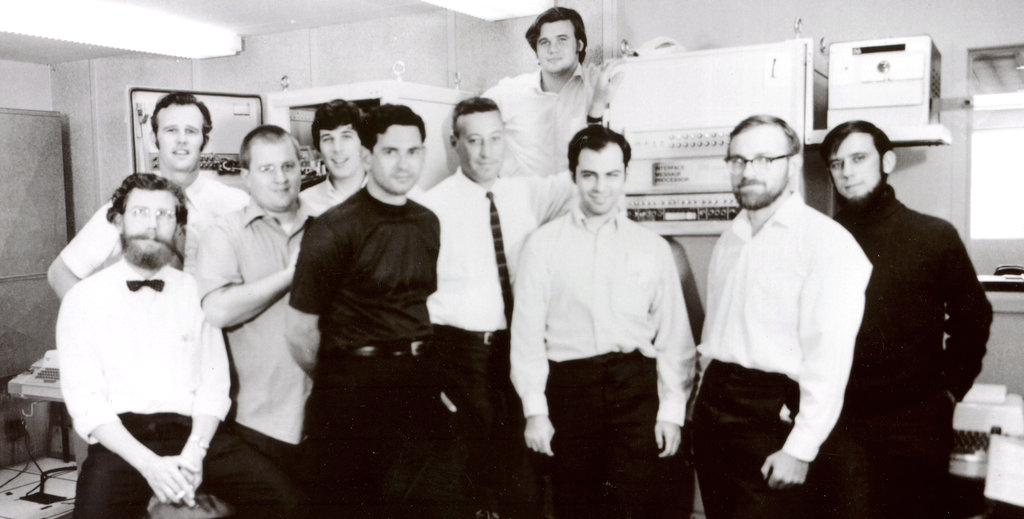
- IMP Team (left to right): Truett Thatch, Bill Bartell, Dave Walden, Jim Geisman, Robert Kahn, Frank Heart, Ben Barker, Marty Thorpe, Will Crowther, and Severo Ornstein
- Born: Frank Evans Heart; May 15, 1929; New York City, U.S.
- Died: June 24, 2018 (aged 89); Lexington, Massachusetts, U.S.
- Education: Massachusetts Institute of Technology
- Occupation: Computer engineer
- Employers: MIT Lincoln Laboratory; Bolt, Beranek and Newman
- Known for: Co-designing the IMP
- Spouse: Jane Sundgaard (m. 1959; died 2014)
- Children: 3
- Awards: Internet Hall of Fame (2014)

Frank Evans Heart (May 15, 1929 – June 24, 2018) was an American computer engineer influential in computer networking. After nearly 15 years working for MIT Lincoln Laboratory, Heart worked for Bolt, Beranek and Newman from 1966 to 1994, during which he led a team that designed the first routing computer for the ARPANET, the predecessor to the Internet.

== Background ==
Born to a Jewish family in The Bronx, New York City, Heart grew up in Yonkers. His father was an engineer at the Otis Elevator Company; his mother was an insurance agent.

Entering as an electrical engineering major, Heart enrolled at the Massachusetts Institute of Technology (MIT) in 1947, entering a five-year master's degree program which he alternated semesters between work and school. During one summer, he worked as a power transformer tester at a General Electric factory. In 1951, he enrolled in MIT's new computer programming course taught by Gordon Welchman. Taking the course led Heart to complete his undergraduate coursework early. During his graduate studies, Heart was a research assistant on Whirlwind I, a computer that controlled an aircraft-tracking radar defense system; Whirlwind would be transferred to the MIT Lincoln Laboratory, the on-campus military contractor. Heart received both bachelor's and master's degrees in electrical engineering in 1952.

== Career ==
At Lincoln Lab, Heart remained as a staff member after completing his master's degree. Eventually, Heart became a team lead for projects in building real-time computing systems where measuring devices gathered data by phone lines connected to computers. Katie Hafner and Matthew Lyon wrote about Heart's management style in their 1996 book Where Wizards Stay Up Late: The Origins of the Internet:

Heart liked working with small, tightly knit groups composed of very bright people. He believed that individual productivity and talent varied not by factors of two or three, but by factors of ten or a hundred. Because Heart had a knack for spotting engineers who could make things happen, the groups he had supervised at Lincoln tended to be unusually productive.

In 1966, Heart left Lincoln Lab after being recruited by research and development company Bolt, Beranek and Newman (BBN). In August 1968, BBN won a request for proposal from ARPA to build the first Interface Message Processor (IMP), a computer that transmitted data and interconnected a network known today as a router. Jerry Elkind assigned Heart to be project manager.

With Severo Ornstein as hardware lead and Will Crowther the software lead, Heart's team of ten engineers used a rugged Honeywell DDP-516 minicomputer to engineer the IMP, whose special function was to switch data among the computers on the ARPANET. The team also invented remote diagnostics for computers by equipping IMPs with remote control capabilities. By September 6, 1968, Heart's team finalized the nearly 200-page, $100,000 IMP proposal, which was BBN's most expensive project to date. The first IMP was installed at the University of California, Los Angeles on September 1, Labor Day of 1969, and the second was installed at the Stanford Research Institute in Menlo Park, California, a month later on October 1.

Heart, wrote Hafner and Lyon, had become "a highly regarded and valuable project manager" at BBN, because his teams had members "committed to a common mission rather than a personal agenda" and "who took personal responsibility for what they did." Influenced by working at Lincoln Lab for Jay Forrester, the inventor of core memory, Heart prioritized reliability over cost, performance, or other factors, being "a most defensive driver when it came to engineering." He also preferred that his programming teams code working products rather than simulations or software tools. By 1971, Heart's IMP team had grown to 30 and transitioned to a lighter Honeywell 316 for the IMP.

In 1972, Heart appeared in the ARPANET documentary Computer Networks: The Heralds of Resource Sharing.

In 1989, the federal government decommissioned ARPANET. Most of the IMPs were disassembled; a few remain in museums and computer labs. However, many of Heart's core principles, such as reliability and error detection and correction, still exist within the Internet. Heart's final position at BBN was as president of the systems and technology division; he would retire from BBN by the summer of 1994.

In 2014, Heart was inducted into the Internet Hall of Fame.

== Personal life ==
While working at Lincoln Laboratory, Heart met Jane Sundgaard, one of the company's first women programmers. They married in 1959 and had three children, and the family lived in Lincoln, Massachusetts, during Heart's career at BBN. Jane Heart died in 2014. On June 24, 2018, Frank Heart died of melanoma at age 89 in a retirement community in Lexington, Massachusetts.

== Bibliography ==
- Hafner, Katie; Lyon, Matthew (1998) [1996]. Where Wizards Stay Up Late: The Origins of the Internet. New York: Touchstone. ISBN 0-684-87216-1.
