= Wesley A. Clark =

American physicist and computer engineer (1927–2016)

- Wes Clark in 2009
- Born: Wesley Allison Clark; April 10, 1927; New Haven, Connecticut, U.S.
- Died: February 22, 2016 (aged 88); Brooklyn, New York City, New York, U.S.
- Education: UC Berkeley
- Known for: TX-0; TX-2; LINC
- Awards: Eckert–Mauchly Award; Computer Pioneer Award; National Academy of Engineering member
- Scientific career
- Fields: Computer engineering; Internet
- Workplaces: MIT Lincoln Laboratory; Washington University; Clark, Rockoff and Associates

Wesley Allison Clark (April 10, 1927 – February 22, 2016) was an American physicist and computer engineer who is credited for designing the first modern personal computer. He was also a computer designer and the main participant, along with Charles Molnar, in the creation of the LINC computer, which was the first minicomputer and shares with a number of other computers (such as the PDP-1) the claim to be the inspiration for the personal computer.

Clark was born in New Haven, Connecticut, and grew up in Kinderhook, New York, and in northern California. His parents, Wesley Sr. and Eleanor Kittell, moved to California, and he attended the University of California, Berkeley, where he graduated with a degree in physics in 1947. Clark began his career as a physicist at the Hanford Site. In 1981, Clark received the Eckert–Mauchly Award for his work on computer architecture. He was awarded an honorary degree by Washington University in St. Louis in 1984. He was elected to the National Academy of Engineering in 1999. Clark is a charter recipient of the IEEE Computer Society Computer Pioneer Award for "First Personal Computer".

== At Lincoln Laboratory ==
Clark moved to the MIT Lincoln Laboratory in 1952 where he joined the Project Whirlwind staff. There he was involved in the development of the Memory Test Computer (MTC), a testbed for ferrite core memory that was to be used in Whirlwind. His sessions with the MTC, "lasting hours rather than minutes" helped form his views that computers were to be used as tools on demand for those who needed them. That view carried over into his designs for the TX-0 and TX-2 and the LINC. He expresses this view clearly here:

...both of the Cambridge machines, Whirlwind and MTC, had been completely committed to the air defense effort and were no longer available for general use. The only surviving computing system paradigm seen by M.I.T. students and faculty was that of a very large International Business Machine in a tightly sealed Computation Center: the computer not as tool, but as demigod. Although we were not happy about giving up the TX-0, it was clear that making this small part of Lincoln's advanced technology available to a larger M.I.T. community would be an important corrective step.

Clark is

one of the fathers of the personal computer... he was the architect of both the TX-0 and TX-2 at Lincoln Labs. He believed that "a computer should be just another piece of lab equipment." At a time when most computers were huge remote machines operated in batch mode, he advocated far more interactive access. He practiced what he preached, even though it often meant bucking current "wisdom" and authority (in a 1981 lecture, he mentioned that he had the distinction of being, "the only person to have been fired three times from MIT for insubordination".)

Clark's design for the TX-2 "integrated a number of man-machine interfaces that were just waiting for the right person to show up to use them in order to make a computer that was 'on-line'. When selecting a PhD thesis topic, an MIT student named Ivan Sutherland looked at the simple cathode ray tube and light pen on the TX-2's console and thought one should be able to draw on the computer. Thus was born Sketchpad, and with it, interactive computer graphics."

== At Washington University ==
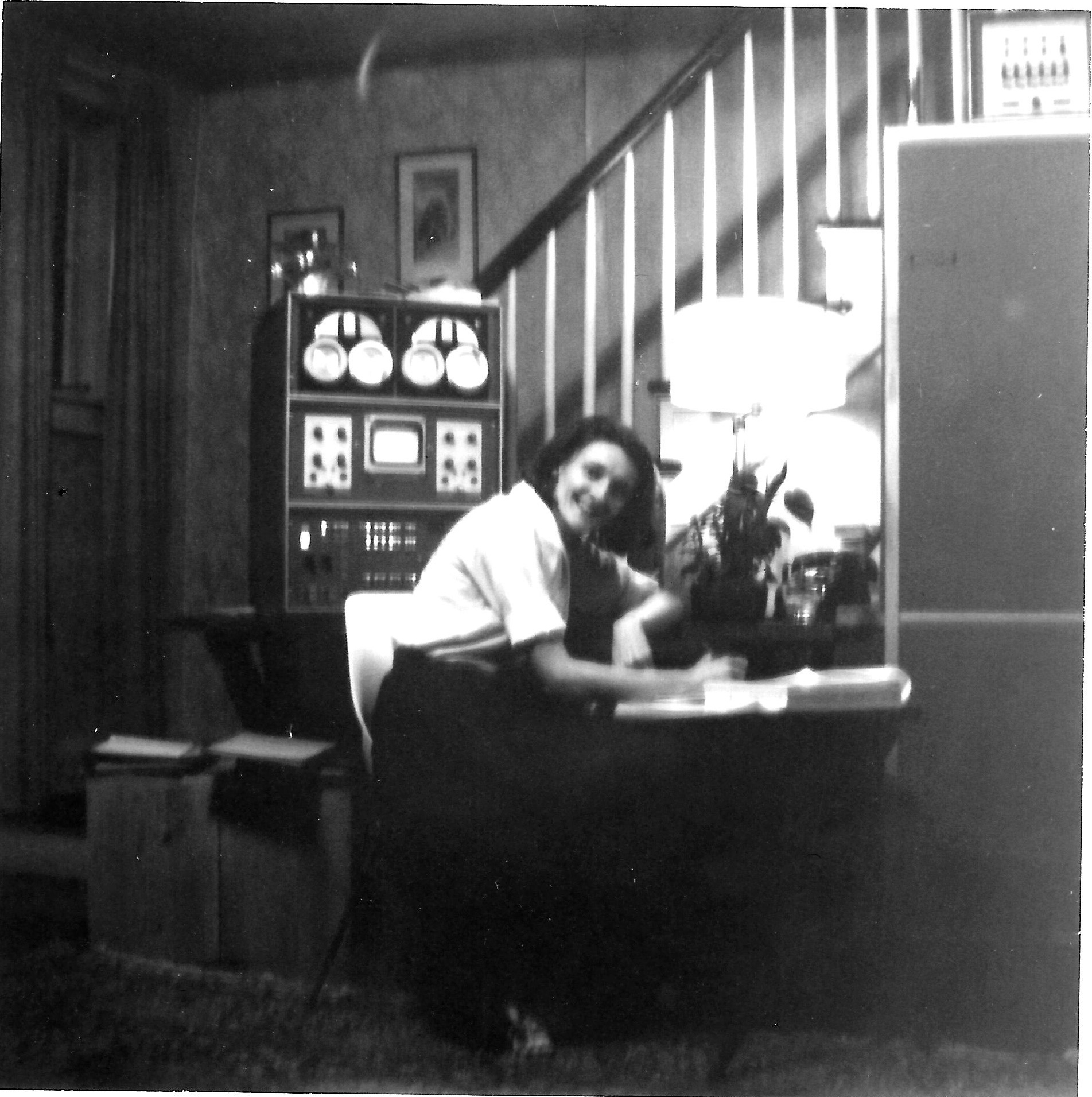
LINC home computer

In 1964, Clark moved to Washington University in St. Louis where he and Charles Molnar worked on macromodules, which were the fundamental building blocks in the world of asynchronous computing. The goal of the macromodules was to provide a set of basic building blocks that would allow computer users to build and extend their computers without requiring any knowledge of electrical engineering.

The New York Times series on the history of the personal computer had this to say in an article on August 19, 2001, "How the Computer Became Personal":

In the pantheon of personal computing, the LINC, in a sense, came first—more than a decade before Ed Roberts made PC's affordable for ordinary people. Work started on the Linc, the brainchild of the M.I.T. physicist Wesley A. Clark, in May 1961, and the machine was used for the first time at the National Institute of Mental Health in Bethesda, MD, the next year to analyze a cat's neural responses.

Each Linc had a tiny screen and keyboard and comprised four metal modules, which together were about as big as two television sets, set side by side and tilted back slightly. The machine, a 12-bit computer, included a one-half megahertz processor. Lincs sold for about $43,000—a bargain at the time—and were ultimately made commercially by Digital Equipment, the first minicomputer company. Fifty Lincs of the original design were built.

== Role in ARPANET ==
Clark had a key insight in the planning for the ARPANET (the predecessor to the Internet). In April 1967, he suggested to Bob Taylor and Larry Roberts the idea of using separate small computers (later named Interface Message Processors) as a way of forming a message switching network and reducing load on the local computers. The same idea had earlier been independently developed by Donald Davies for the NPL network. The concept of packet switching was introduced to the ARPANET later, after the Symposium on Operating Systems Principles in October 1967.

== Post-Nixon China trip ==
In 1972, shortly after President Nixon's trip to China, Clark accompanied five other computer scientists to China for three weeks to "tour computer facilities and to discuss computer technology with Chinese experts in Shanghai and Beijing. Officially, the trip was seen by the Chinese in two lights: as a step in reestablishing the long-interrupted friendship between the two nations and as a step in opening channels for technical dialogue." The trip was organized by his colleague Severo Ornstein from MIT Lincoln Laboratory and Washington University. The other members of the group were: Thomas E. Cheatham, Anatol Holt, Alan J. Perlis and Herbert A. Simon.

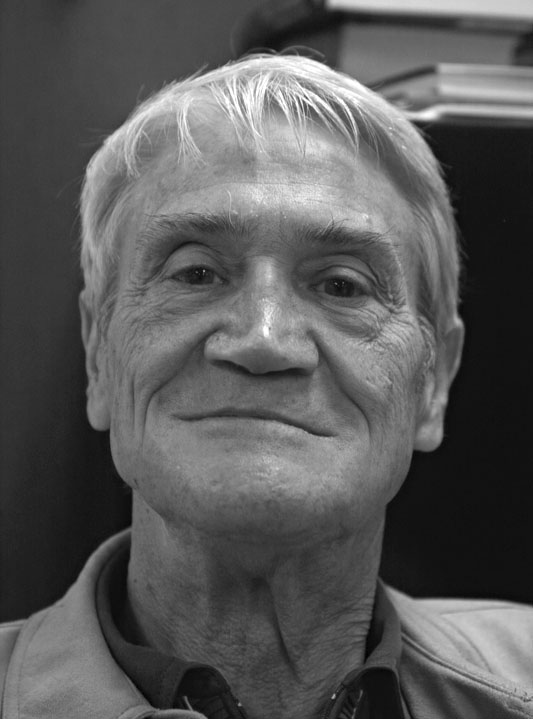
Clark in 2002

== Death ==
He was 88 when he died on February 22, 2016, at his home in Brooklyn due to severe atherosclerotic cardiovascular disease.

== See also ==
- List of pioneers in computer science
