= Honeywell System 700 =

1970s minicomputer family

- Manufacturer: Honeywell, Inc.

The Honeywell System 700 is a family of discontinued 16-bit minicomputers from Honeywell, Inc..

The System 700 was introduced in 1972 and was intended for use as "key elements in a complete functional system rather than as small 'bare bones' central processors."

As announced, the line comprises eight systems. Two systems use the older Honeywell 316 processor, and either the OP-16 or the BOS operating systems. The remaining six systems use the newer 716 processor, and the OS/700 operating system, which can be either disk- or memory-resident, or OP-16 or BOS. Systems came pre-configured as "a terminal control system, a peripheral control system, a multi-purpose system, a batch processing system, two sensor-based systems, a remote line concentrator and a remote message concentrator." A minimal system had a monthly rental as low as $1000 per month (equivalent to $7,500 in 2024), or could be purchased for $30,000 (equivalent to $226,000 in 2024).

"Both hardware and software place emphasis on the real-time processing required for process control, data collection, and data communications environments."

== Processor ==
The 716 processor in the System 700 is backwards-compatible with the 316 and 516 processors, but adds features unavailable in these older processors. It is 20% faster than the DDP-516 and more than twice as fast as the H316.

== Users ==
The System 700 was the standard remote terminal for the US military's Worldwide Military Command and Control System (WWMCCS) systems, which were built around Honeywell 6000 series mainframe systems.
