= Computer Control Company =

American minicomputer company

Computer Control Company, Inc. (1953–1966), informally known as 3C, was a pioneering minicomputer company known for its DDP-series (Digital Data Processor) computers, notably: (Note: One of the developers of the DDP-124, William Poduska, who later on became one of the founders of Prime Computer, said in a 2002 interview that the 124 came after the 224, which came after the 24.)

- DDP-24 24-bit (1963)
- DDP-224 24-bit (1965)
- DDP-116 16-bit (1965)
- DDP-124 24-bit (1966) using monolithic ICs

It was founded in 1953 by Dr. Louis Fein, the physicist who had earlier designed the Raytheon RAYDAC computer.

The company moved to Framingham, Massachusetts, in 1959. Prior to the introduction of the DDP-series it developed a series of digital logical modules, initially based on vacuum tubes.

In 1966, it was sold to Honeywell, Inc. As the Computer Controls division of Honeywell, it introduced further DDP-series computers, and was a $100,000,000 business until 1970 when Honeywell purchased GE's computer division and discontinued development of the DDP line.

In a 1970 essay, Murray Bookchin used the DDP-124 as his example of computer progress:

In 1945, J. Presper Eckert, Jr. and John W. Mauchly of the University of Pennsylvania unveiled the ENIAC ... it weighed more than thirty tons, contained 18,800 vacuum tubes with half a million connections (the connections took Eckert and Mauchly two and a half years to solder. It often broke down or behaved erratically... Some twenty years later, the Computer Control Company of Framingham, Massachusetts offered the DDP-124 for sale. The DDP-124 is a small, compact computer that resembles a bedside AM-radio receiver. The entire ensemble, together with a typewriter and memory unit, occupies a typical office desk. The DDP-124 performs over 285,000 computations a second. It has a true stored-program memory that can be expanded to retain nearly 33,000 words... Its pulses cycle at 1.75 billion[sic] per second. The DDP-124 does not require any air-conditioning unit. It is completely reliable, and it creates very few maintenance problems.... The difference between ENIAC and DDP-124 is one of degree rather than kind.

One of the oddest of the DDP series was the DDP 19—of which only three were built on custom order for the U.S. Weather service. Its architecture was based on a 19-bit word structure consisting of six octal bytes plus a sign bit, which in arithmetic operations could create the unusual value of "negative zero". One of these machines was donated by the government to the Milwaukee Area Technical College in 1972, which included a drum-based line printer and dual Ampex magnetic tape drives. It was used for a limited number of students as an "extra credit project device" for the next 2–3 years, after which it was scrapped to make space for newer equipment. The fate of the other two units is unknown.
