= Ellen W. Zegura =

American computer scientist

Professor Ellen Witte Zegura
- Awards: Fellow of the Association for Computing Machinery

Academic background
- Education: Washington University in St. Louis
- Doctoral advisor: Jonathan S. Turner

Academic work
- Discipline: Computer science
- Sub-discipline: computer network
- Institutions: Georgia Institute of Technology College of Computing

Ellen Witte Zegura is an American computer scientist who works as a professor in the School of Computer Science at the Georgia Institute of Technology College of Computing, and was the founding chair of the school from 2007 to 2012. Her research concerns a combination of computer network research and computing for social good.

== Life and work ==
Zegura majored in computer science at Washington University in St. Louis, graduating in 1987, and remained there for her graduate studies. For her Masters's degree (1990), she developed algorithms and programmed an nCUBE hypercube parallel machine. She completed her doctorate in 1993 under the supervision of Jonathan S. Turner, and joined the Georgia Tech faculty in the same year and was appointed a Regents Professor there in 2020.

Her research concerns computer networking with a specific focus on applications and network-layer services. Her current research has grown to include the potential role of computing as it can help address pressing social problems.

At Georgia Tech, Zegura participates in a 10-year university initiative to link technology and community development efforts. The program's coursework includes content from the fields of Public Policy, Human-Centered Design and Community Engagement.

In 2011, she became a Fellow of the IEEE and in 2013 she was named a Fellow of the Association for Computing Machinery "for contributions to communication and computation in intermittingly-connected networks."
