= Honeywell 316 =

Minicomputer built by Honeywell

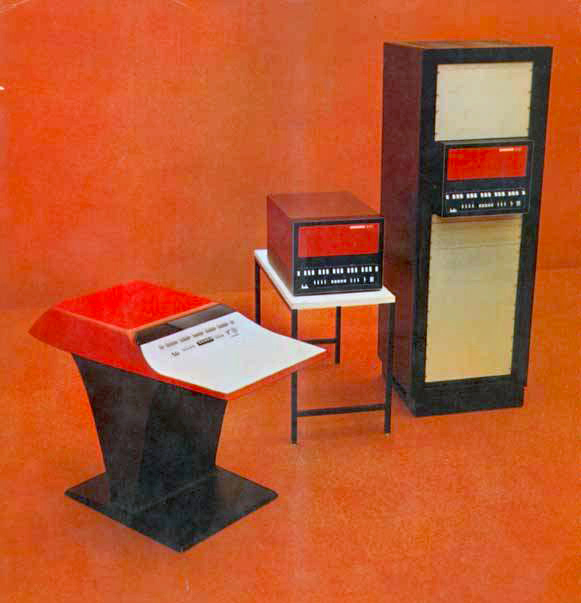
- Type: 16-bit minicomputer
- Released: 1969
- Memory: 4K to 32K words, magnetic-core

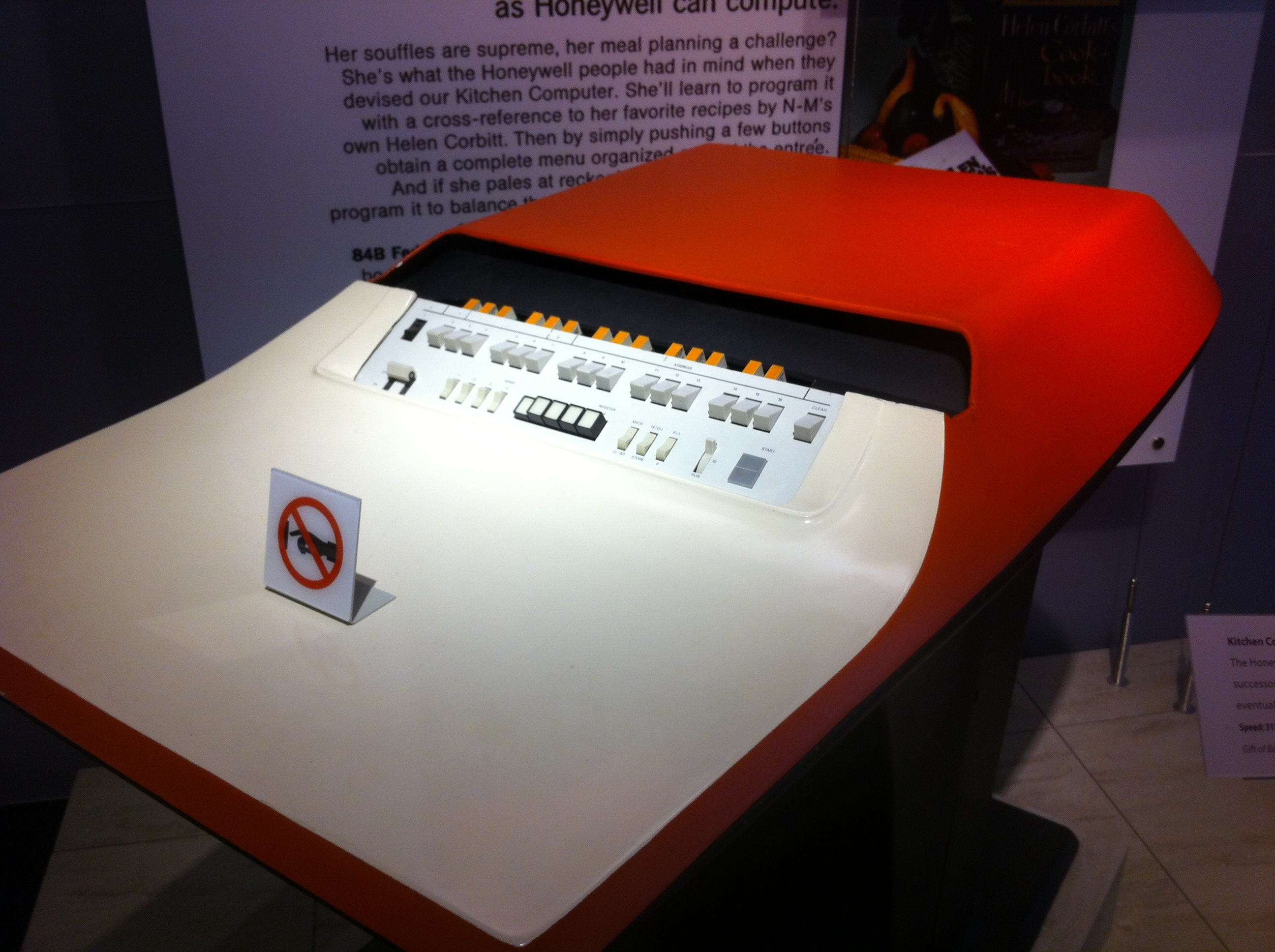
A Honeywell 316 at the Computer History Museum

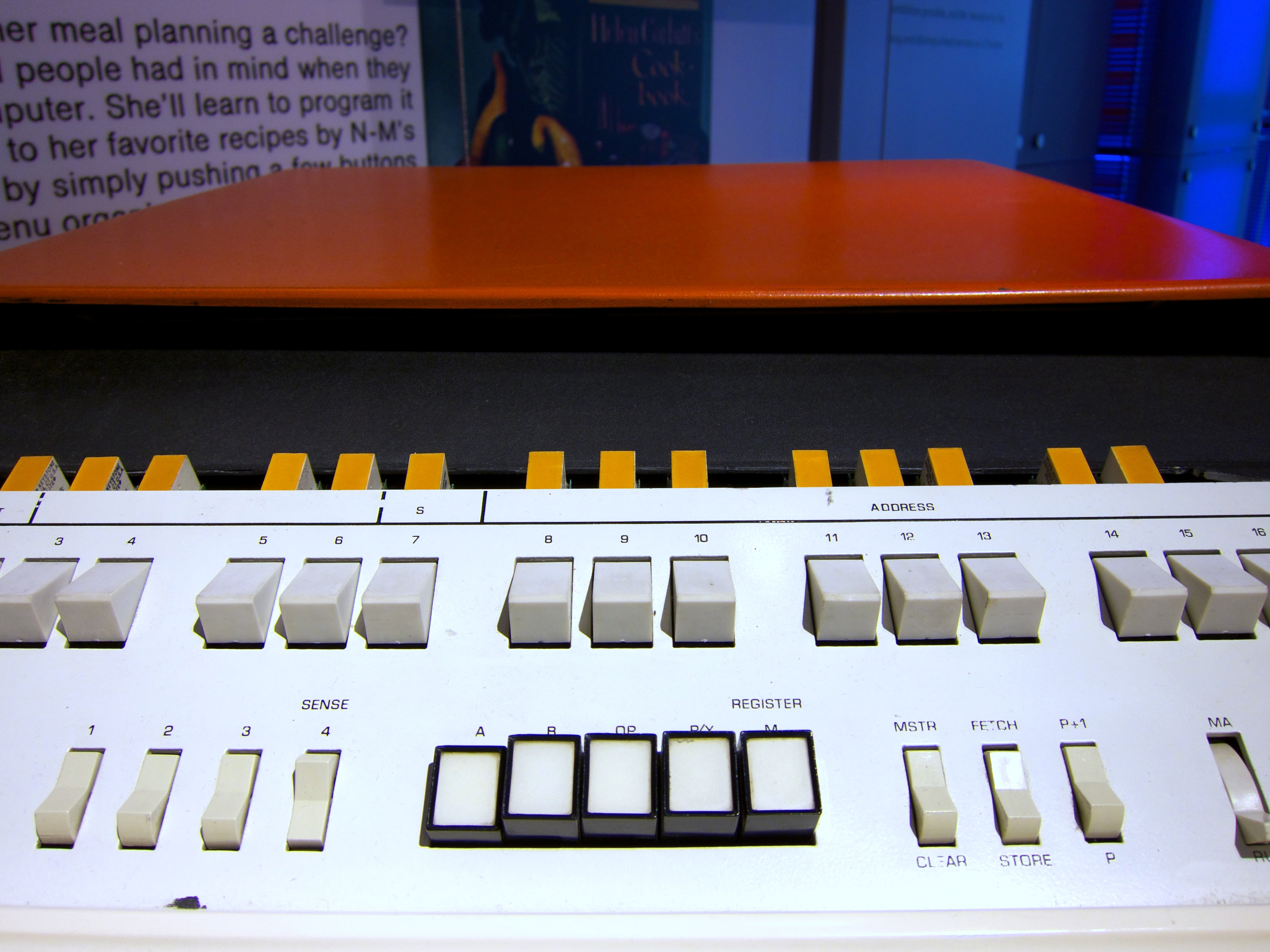
Honeywell 316 control panel

The Honeywell 316 was a popular 16-bit minicomputer built by Honeywell starting in 1969. It is part of the Series 16, which includes the Models 116 (1965, discrete), 316 (1969), 416 (1966), 516 (1966) and DDP-716 (1969). They were commonly used for data acquisition and control, remote message concentration, clinical laboratory systems, Remote Job Entry and time-sharing. The Series-16 computers are all based on the DDP-116 designed by Gardner Hendrie at Computer Control Company, Inc. (3C) in 1964.

The 516 and later the 316 were used as Interface Message Processors (IMP) for the American ARPANET and the British NPL Network.

== History ==
Computer Control Company developed a computer series named Digital Data Processor, of which it built two models:

- DDP-116 – the first of the Series 16
- DDP-124 – part of a trio of 24-bit systems: DDP-24, 124, 224.

Honeywell bought the company after the 24 trio, and built the balance of the Series 16.

The Honeywell 516 was used in the NPL network for the first implementation of packet switching in early 1969. The 516 and later the 316 were also used as Interface Message Processors (IMP) for the ARPANET. In addition, it was later configured as a Terminal IMP (TIP), which added support for up to 63 teletype machines through a multi-line controller.

The H-316 was used by Charles H. Moore to develop the first complete, stand-alone implementation of Forth at NRAO in 1971.

The original Prime computers were designed to be compatible with the Series-16 minicomputers.

The Honeywell 316 also had industrial applications. A 316 was used at Bradwell nuclear power station in Essex as the primary reactor temperature-monitoring computer until summer 2000, when the internal 160k disk failed. Two PDP-11/70s, which had previously been secondary monitors, were moved to primary.

== Hardware description ==
The 316 succeeded the earlier DDP-516 model and was promoted by Honeywell as suitable for industrial process control, data-acquisition systems, and as a communications concentrator and processor. The computer processor was made from small-scale integration DTL monolithic silicon integrated circuits. Most parts of the system operated at 2.5 MHz, and some elements were clocked at 5 MHz. The computer is a bitwise-parallel 2's complement system with 16-bit word length. The instruction set was a single-address type with an index register. Initially released with a capacity of 4096 through 16,384 words of memory, later expansion options allowed increasing memory space to 32,768 words. Memory cycle time is 1.6 microseconds; an integer register-to-register "add" instruction takes 3.2 microseconds. An optional hardware arithmetic option was available to implement integer multiply and divide, double-precision load and store, and double-precision (31-bit) integer addition and subtraction operations. It also provides a normalization operation, assisting implementation of software floating-point operations.

The programmers' model of the H-316 consists of the following registers:

- The 16-bit A register is the primary arithmetic and logic accumulator.
- The 16-bit B register is used for double-length arithmetic operations.
- The 16-bit program counter holds the address of the next instruction.
- A carry flag indicates arithmetic overflow.
- A 16-bit X index register provides for modification of the address of operands.

The instruction set has 72 arithmetic, logic, I/O and flow-control instructions.

Input/output instructions use the A register and separate input and output 16-bit buses. A 10-bit I/O control bus, consisting of 6 bits of device address information and 4 bits of function selection, is used. The basic processor has a single interrupt signal line, and an option provided up to 48 interrupts.

In addition to a front-panel display of lights and toggle switches, the system supports different types of input/output devices. A Teletype Model 33 ASR teleprinter can be used as a console I/O device and (in the most basic systems) to load and store data to paper tape. Smaller systems typically use a high-speed paper-tape reader and punch for data storage. The Honeywell family of peripherals included card readers and punches, line printers, magnetic tape, and both fixed-head and removable hard disk drives.

A rack-mounted configuration weighs around 120 pounds (54 kg) and used 475 watts of power. Honeywell advertised the system as the first minicomputer selling for less than $10,000.

The Honeywell 316 has the distinction of being the first computer displayed at a computer show with semiconductor RAM memory. In 1972, a Honeywell 316 was displayed with a semiconductor RAM memory board (they used core memory previously). It was never placed into production, as DTL was too power-hungry to survive much longer. Honeywell knew that the same technology that enabled the production of RAM spelled the end of DTL computers, and wanted to show that the company was cutting edge.

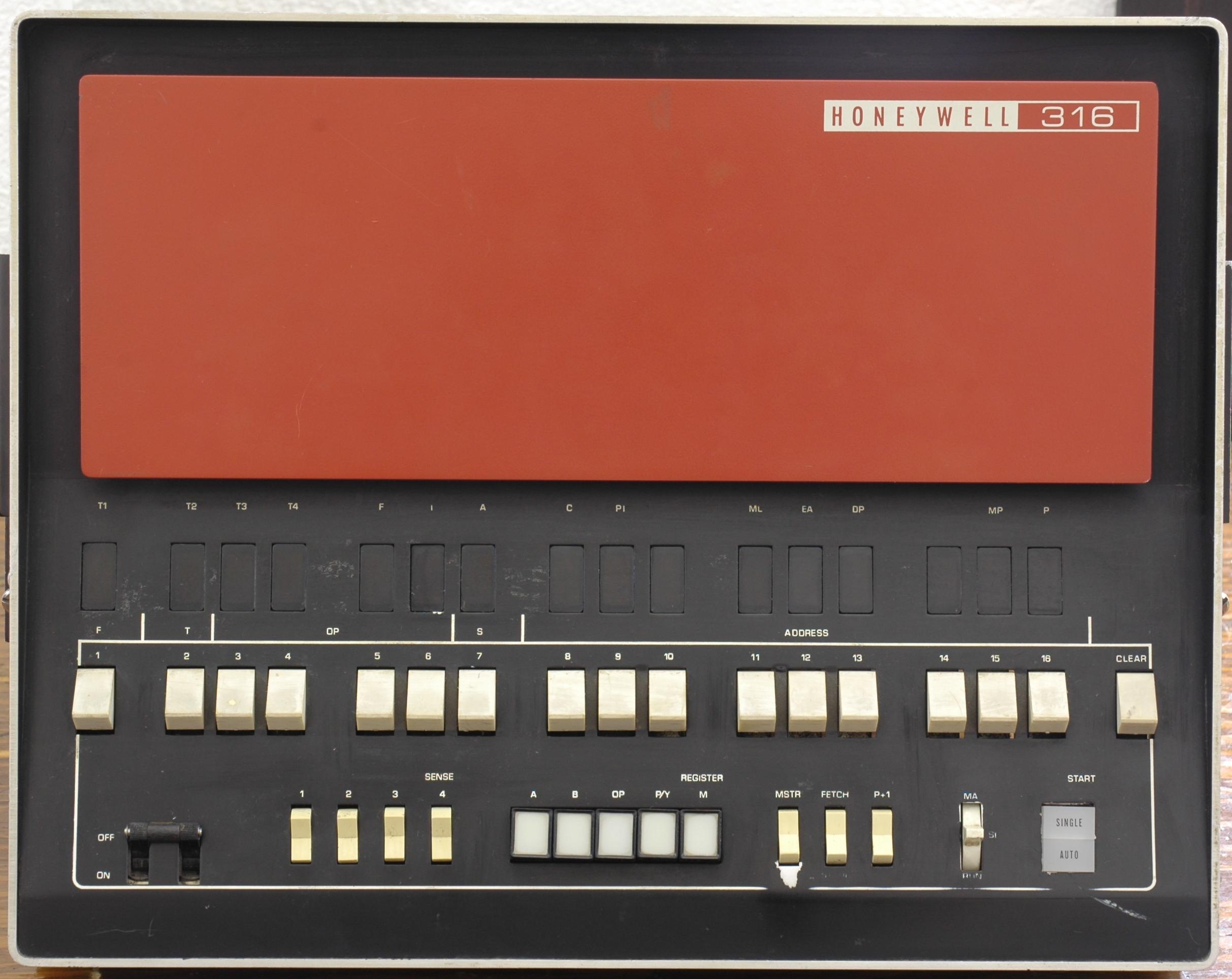
Front panel of H316 in a desktop case

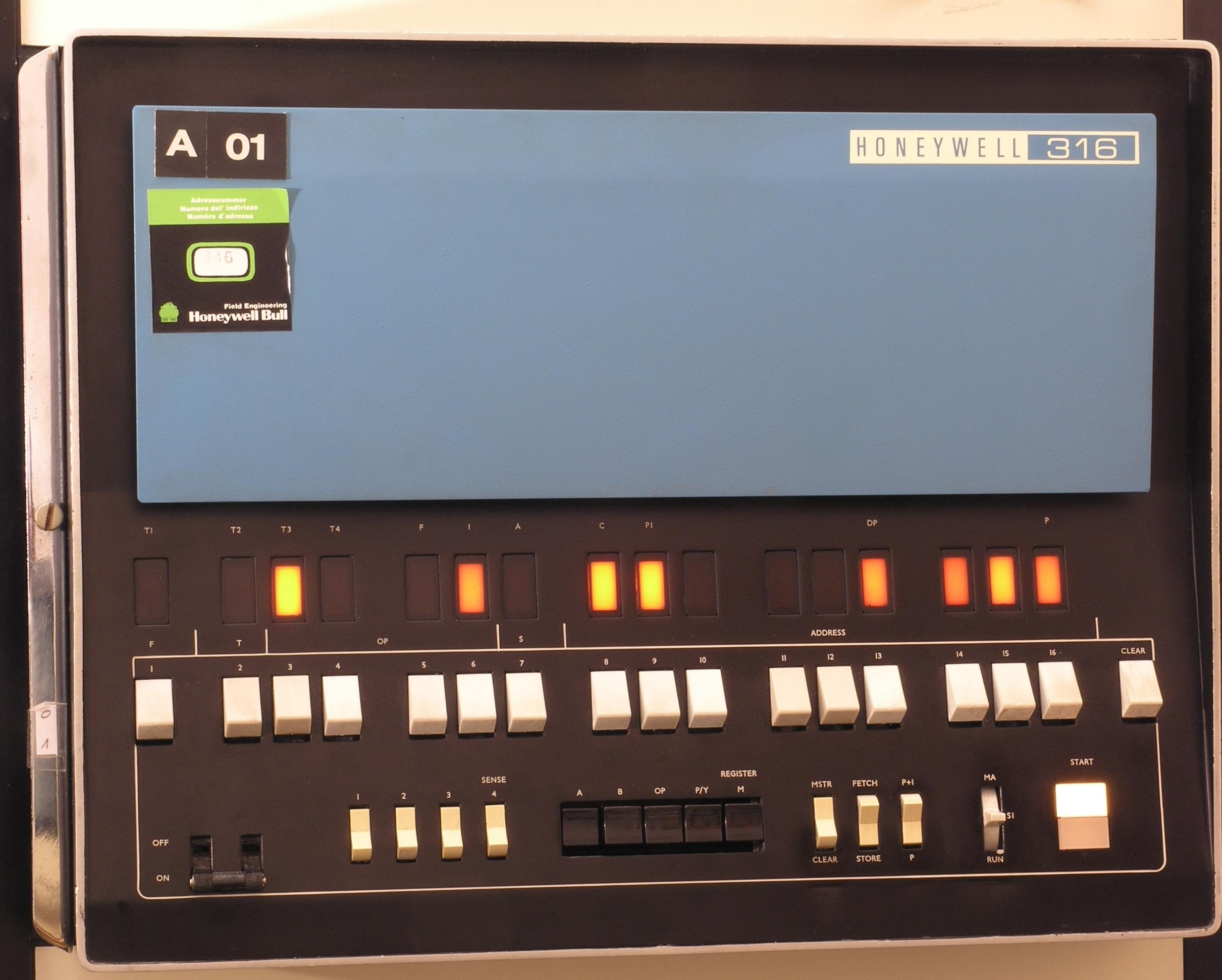
Rack-mounted version of H316

== System software ==
Honeywell provided up to 500 software packages that could run on the H-316 processor. A FORTRAN IV compiler was available, as well as an assembler, real-time disk operating systems and system utilities and libraries.

== Kitchen Computer ==
An ad for the Neiman Marcus Kitchen Computer, offered in 1969, with Helen Corbitt's recipes. The tagline is "If she can only cook as well as Honeywell can compute"

The full text of the Neiman-Marcus Advertisement reads:

If she can only cook as well as Honeywell can compute.

Her souffles are supreme, her meal planning a challenge? She's what the Honeywell people had in mind when they devised our Kitchen Computer. She'll learn to program it with a cross-reference to her favorite recipes by N-M's own Helen Corbitt. Then by simply pushing a few buttons obtain a complete menu organized around the entree. And if she pales at reckoning her lunch tabs, she can program it to balance the family checkbook. 84A 10,600.00 complete with two week programming course. 84B Fed with Corbitt data: the original Helen Corbitt cookbook with over 1,000 recipes 5.00 (.75) 84C Her Potluck, 375 of our famed Zodiac restaurant's best kept secret recipes 3.95 (.75) Corbitt Epicure 84D Her Tabard Apron, one-size, ours alone by Clairdon House, multi-pastel provincial cotton 26.00 (.90) Trophy Room

The Honeywell Kitchen Computer was a special offering of the H316 pedestal model by Neiman Marcus in 1969 as one of a continuing series of extravagant gift ideas. It was offered for US$10,000 (equivalent to US$88,000 in 2025), weighed over 100 pounds (over 45 kg) and was advertised as useful for storing recipes. The imagined uses of the Honeywell Kitchen Computer also included assistance with meal planning and balancing the family checkbook – the marketing of which included highly traditional and patronizing representations of housewives. Reading or entering these recipes would have been nearly impossible for the average intended user, since the user interface required the user to complete a two-week course just to learn how to program the device, using only toggle-switch input and binary-light output. To round out the domestic marketing, the pedestal model's writing surface was rebranded as a built-in cutting board and the computer would have a few recipes built in. No evidence has been found that any Honeywell Kitchen Computers were ever sold, though Honeywell did sell a small number (less than 20) pedestal computers outside of the Neiman Marcus branding.

Although a fantasy gift, the Kitchen Computer represented the first time a computer was offered as a consumer product.

== See also ==
- SIMH
- Honeywell System 700
- Honeywell 200
- GE-600 series
- Honeywell 6000 series
- Honeywell 800
