= Charles Molnar =

American computer scientist (1935–1996)

Charles Edwin Molnar
- Photo by Herb Weitman/WUSTL
- Born: March 14, 1935; Newmark, New Jersey
- Died: December 13, 1996 (aged 61); Sunnyvale, California
- Education: Rutgers University (BS, MS); MIT (Sc.D.)
- Known for: Asynchronous computing
- Scientific career
- Fields: Electrical Engineering
- Institutions: Washington University in St. Louis; Sun Microsystems

Charles Edwin Molnar (1935–1996) was a co-developer of one of the first minicomputers, the LINC (Laboratory Instrument Computer), while a graduate student at Massachusetts Institute of Technology (MIT) in 1962. His collaborator was Wesley A. Clark.

The LINC originated decades before the advent of the personal computer. Its development was the result of a National Institutes of Health (NIH) program that placed 20 copies of an early LINC prototype in selected biomedical research laboratories nationwide. Later, the LINC was produced in greater numbers by Digital Equipment Corporation and other computer manufacturers. Later he was on the faculty of Washington University in St. Louis.

Charlie Molnar was also well known as a pioneer in the modeling of the auditory system, especially numerical models of the function of the cochlea (the inner ear).

When he died in 1996, he was working at Sun Microsystems on asynchronous circuits with Ivan Sutherland.

Molnar received a bachelor's degree (1956) and a master's degree (1957) in electrical engineering from Rutgers University, where he was a member of the Cap and Skull Society, and received a doctoral degree (1966) from MIT in electrical engineering.

== Important publications ==
Molnar's significant publications included the following:

- Clark, W.A. and C.E. Molnar, 1964, "The LINC," Anal. New York Academy of Sciences, Vol 115, pp. 653–658.
- Clark, W.A. and C.E. Molnar, 1965, "A Description of the LINC," Computers in Biomedical Research, Vol II, B.D. Waxman and R. Stacey, eds, Academic Press, New York, NY.
- Model for the Convergence of Inputs Upon Neurons in the Cochlear Nucleus, D.Sc. Thesis, MIT, 1966.
- Chaney, T.J. and C.E. Molnar, "Anomalous Behavior of Synchronizer and Arbiter Circuits," IEEE Trans. on Computers, Vol. C-22, No. 4, pp. 421–422, Apr. 1973.
- Kim, D.O., C.E. Molnar, and R. R. Pfeiffer, 1973, "A system of nonlinear differential equations modeling basilar-membrane motion," J. Acoust. Soc. Am. 54(6):1517–29 Dec. 1973.
- Clark, W.A. and C.E. Molnar, 1974, "Macromodular Computer Systems," Computers in Biomedical Research, pp. 45–85, Vol IV, B.D. Waxman and R. Stacey, eds, Academic Press, New York, NY.
- Kim, D.O. and C.E. Molnar: Cochlear mechanics: Measurements and models, in The Nervous System, Vol. 3, Human Communication and Its Disorders, edited by DB Tower (Raven, New York) 1975; pp 57–68
- Sproull, R.F., I.E. Sutherland, and C.E. Molnar, 1994, "The Counterflow Pipeline Architecture," IEEE Design and Test of Computers, Vol. 11, no.3, pp. 44–59.
