= Don Woods (programmer) =

American hacker and computer programmer (born 1954)

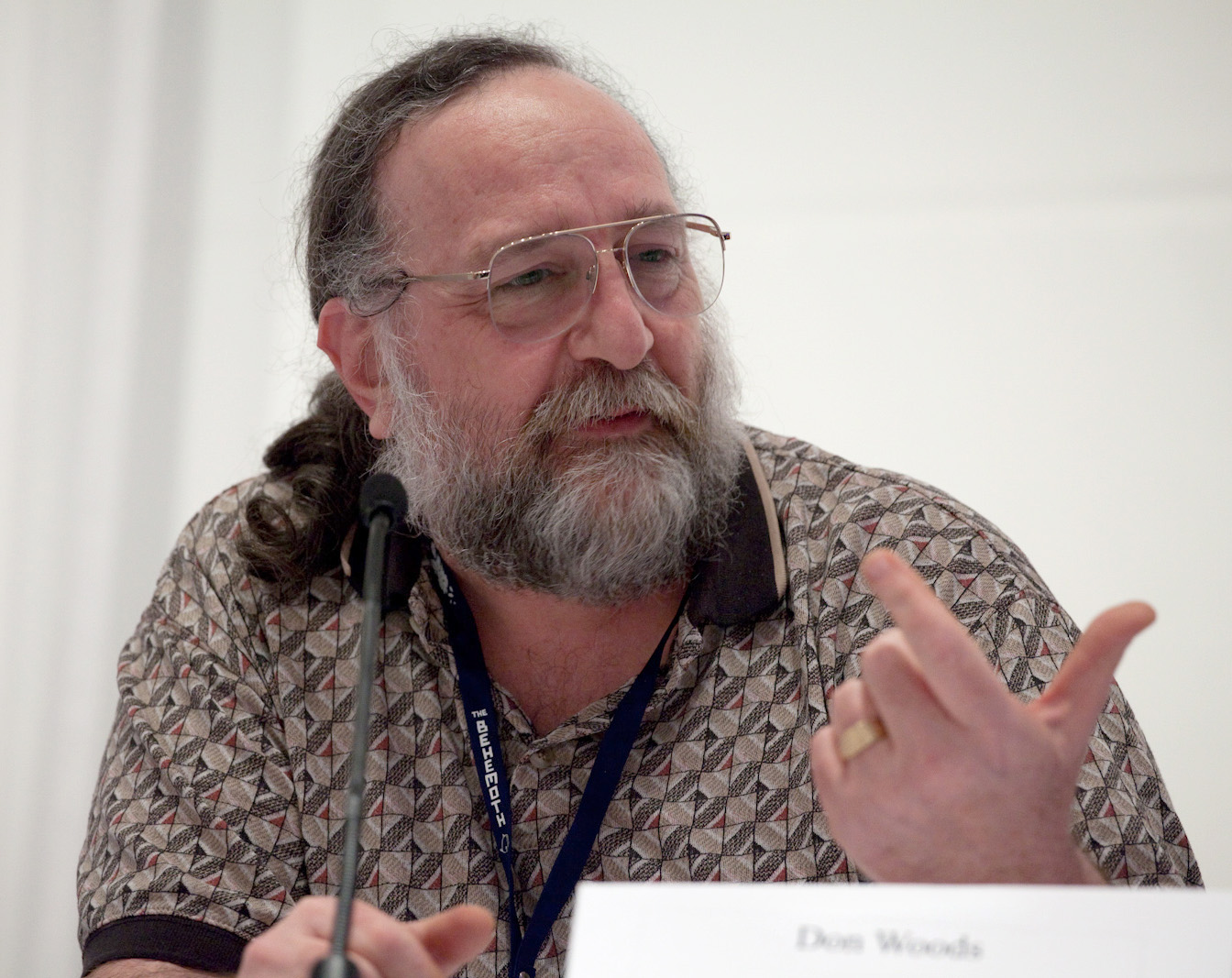
Don Woods in 2010

Donald R. Woods (born April 30, 1954) is an American hacker and computer programmer. He is best known for his role in the development of the Colossal Cave Adventure game.

== Biography ==
=== Early programming career ===
Woods teamed with James M. Lyon while both were attending Princeton in 1972 to produce the unprecedented, excursive INTERCAL programming language. Later, he worked at the Stanford AI lab (SAIL), where among other things he became the SAIL contact for, and a contributor to, the Jargon File. He also co-authored "The Hacker's Dictionary" with Mark Crispin, Raphael Finkel, and Guy L. Steele Jr.

=== Work on Adventure ===
Woods discovered the Colossal Cave Adventure game by accident on a SAIL computer in 1976. After contacting the original author by the (now antiquated) means of sending an e-mail to crowther@sitename, where sitename was every host listed on ARPANET, he heard back from William Crowther shortly afterward.

Given the go-ahead, Woods proceeded to add enhancements to the Adventure game, and then distributed it on the Internet. It became very popular, especially with users of the PDP-10. Woods stocked the Kentucky cave that Crowther had written with new magical items, creatures, and geographical features. Crowther's game, which originally featured few supernatural elements, was transformed into a loose fantasy world featuring elements from role playing games. Woods can thus, in a sense, be considered one of the progenitors of the entire genre of computer adventure games and interactive fiction.

By 1977 tapes of the game were common on the Digital user group DECUS, and others (see The Soul of a New Machine by Tracy Kidder for a human history of this period).
