= DDP-24 =

24-bit computer designed and built by Computer Control Company in 1963

Design
- Manufacturer: Computer Control Company
- Release date: 1963
- Units sold: 25+ (1964)
- Price: $87,000.00

Casing
- Dimensions: Length : 233 cm (92 in); Depth : 100 cm (39 in); Height : 155 cm (61 in)
- Weight: 2,000 pounds (910 kg)
- Power: 2000 W @ 115 V AC

System
- CPU: 24-bit processor @ 200 kHz (5 μs cycle)
- Memory: 98 kilobytes (32767 x 24 bit)
- MIPS: 0.2 MIPS
- FLOPS: 100 000 FLOPS
- Successor: DDP-224

The DDP-24 (1963) was a 24-bit computer designed and built by the Computer Control Company, aka 3C, located in Framingham, Massachusetts. In 1966, the company was sold to Honeywell who continued the DDP line into the 1970s.

== Hardware ==
The DDP-24 was completely transistorized and used magnetic-core memory to store data and program instructions. It had a sign magnitude code to represent positive or negative numbers and used binary logic. The DDP-24 used a single address command format and single operation with index and indirect addressing flags.

== Market acceptance ==
The DDP-24 found use in space and flight simulators of the mid-1960s and other real-time scientific data processing applications.

Peter B. Denes, a researcher at Bell Telephone Laboratories, Inc., installed a DDP-224 system around 1965 for use in speech research. It and a DDP-24 were used by Max Mathews, considered by many to be the founding father of computer music, to develop his GROOVE music system, as related by Professor Barry Vercoe in a 1999 MIT Media Lab interview. When asked to describe the first MIT experimental music studio, Prof. Vercoe replied, "We began that work when I first arrived in 1971. The first studio we had was in the basement of Building 26, where we had a computer given to MIT by Max Mathews--the Honeywell DDP-24. Max initially developed his GROOVE system on this machine and was kind enough to give it to MIT when I joined the faculty." The 3C DDP-24 used modules or cards called S-Pac's. These S-Pac cards could be Flip-Flops, NAND gates, Bit Registers etc. and were housed in a DDP-24 S-Bloc card rack. An early raster-scan graphics display was developed for the computer system.

== External links & Bibliography ==
- DDP-24 Instruction Manual, August 64, PDF
- BRL REPORT NO. 1227 JANUARY 1964
- Adams Report 1967, PDF
- "Oral History of John William (Bill) Poduska" (PDF).
