= Jonathan S. Turner =

American computer scientist

Jonathan Shields Turner
- Born: November 13, 1953 (age 72); Boston, Massachusetts, U.S.
- Education: Northwestern University, Washington University in St. Louis, Oberlin College
- Awards: IEEE Koji Kobayashi Computers and Communications Award; IEEE Millennium Medal
- Scientific career
- Fields: Computer science
- Workplaces: Washington University in St. Louis
- Doctoral students: Ellen W. Zegura

Jonathan Shields Turner is a senior professor of Computer Science in the McKelvey School of Engineering at Washington University in St. Louis. His research interests include the design and analysis of high performance routers and switching systems, extensible communication networks via overlay networks, and probabilistic performance of heuristic algorithms for NP-complete problems.

== Biography ==
Jonathan Shields Turner was born on November 13, 1953, in Boston. Turner started his undergraduate studies at Oberlin College, and later enrolled in the undergraduate engineering program at Washington University. In doing so, he became one of the first dual-degree engineering graduates from Washington University. In 1975, he graduated with a B.A. in theater from Oberlin College. Then, in 1977, he graduated with a B.S. in computer science and a B.S. in electrical engineering from Washington University

Once Turner graduated, he began attending Northwestern University for Computer Science graduate school, and simultaneously began working at Bell Labs as a member of their technical staff. In 1979, he received his M.S. in computer science from Northwestern, and continued on as a doctoral student under the supervision of Hal Sudborough. From 1981 to 1983, he became the principal system architect for the Fast Packet Switching project at Bell Labs. He received eleven patents for his work on the Fast Packet Switching project. In 1982 he published his doctoral dissertation, receiving his Ph.D. in computer science from Northwestern.

Turner joined Washington University in 1983 as an assistant professor in the Computer Science and Electrical Engineering departments. In 1986, he published a paper titled "New Directions in Communications (or Which Way to the Information Age)", which forecast the convergence of data, voice, and video traffic on networks, and proposed scalable switching architectures to handle such a traffic load. This paper would later be reprinted in the 50th anniversary issue of the IEEE Communications Magazine as a "landmark article". In 1988 he founded the Advanced Networking Group and co-founded the Applied Research Laboratory with Washington University colleagues Jerome R. Cox and Guru Parulkar. Turner directed the Applied Research Laboratory (ARL) from its inception to 2012, and directed the Advanced Networking group until it was subsumed by the ARL in 1992. He was promoted to full professor by 1990. He became the Computer Science department chair in 1992 and held this position through 1997. In 1998 Turner co-founded a company named Growth Networks—again in collaboration with Professors Jerome Cox and Guru Parulkar—which focused on high performance switching components for Internet routers and Asynchronous Transfer Mode switches. Turner was Chief Scientist at Growth Networks. In 2000 Cisco acquired Growth Networks for $355 million in stock, largely for the intellectual property and engineering talent. At the time of acquisition, Growth Networks had 55 employees. From 2007 to 2008 he again served as department chair of the Computer Science department. Turner retired from Washington University in 2014 after 30 years with the department. He is now a Senior Professor for the department, and still likes to perform research when he is not sailing the Florida coast or playing tennis with his wife.

== Awards and distinctions ==
Jonathan S. Turner has been awarded 30 patents for his work in switching systems, and has many widely cited publications.

Turner has received honors from a variety of professional organizations. In 1990 he was elected as an IEEE Fellow for "contributions to multipoint switching networks for high-speed packetized information transmission". In 1994 he received the IEEE Koji Kobayashi Computers and Communications Award for "fundamental contributions to communications and computing through architectural innovation in high-speed packet networks. In 2000 he was awarded the IEEE Millennium Medal In 2001 he was elected as an ACM Fellow for research involving and extending his 1986 seminal paper. In 2002 he was awarded the James B. Eads Award from the St. Louis Academy of Science, for outstanding achievement in engineering or technology. In 2007 he was elected to the National Academy of Engineering.

Turner has also received many honors from Washington University. In 1993 he was honored with the Founder's Day Distinguished Faculty Award, which is awarded to faculty who have an "outstanding commitment to the intellectual and personal development of students". In 1994 he became the Henry Edwin Sever Chair of Engineering, which at that time was a new endowed professorship. He held this position until 2006. In 2004 he won the Arthur Holly Compton Faculty Achievement Award, which is similar to the Founder's Day Distinguished Faculty Award but more selective. In 2006 Turner was named the Barbara J. and Jerome R. Cox Professor of Computer Science for "advancing the relationship between theory and practice in the design of digital systems." In 2007 he received an Alumni Achievement Award from the School of Engineering and Applied Science. In 2014 he received the Dean's Award from the Dean of the School of Engineering and Applied Science. Also that year the Computer Science department created the Turner Dissertation Award in recognition of his many achievements and research contributions.
