= Bean salad =

Common cold salad composed of various cooked or pickled beans

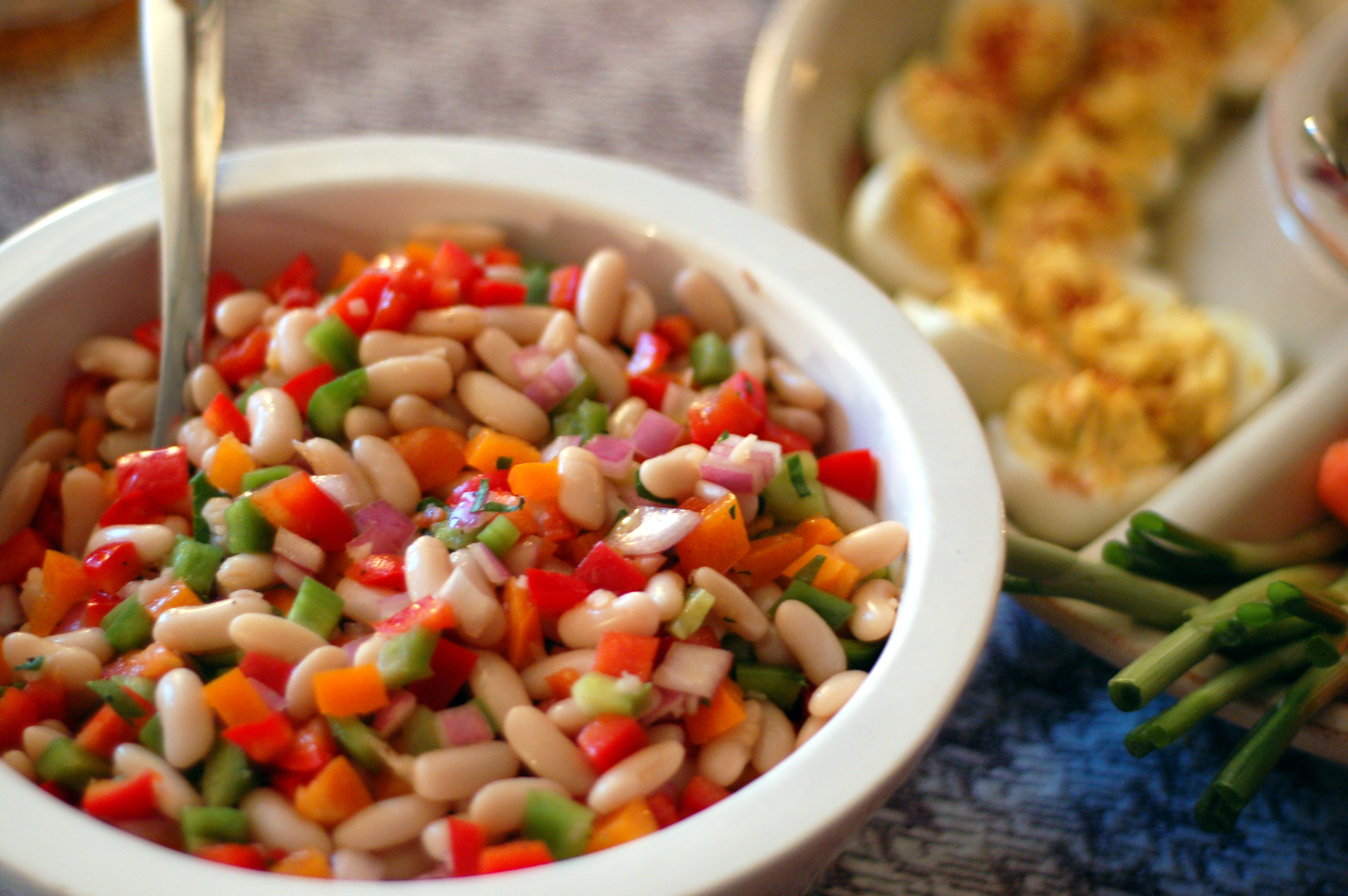
- Bean salad made with white beans, red and green bell peppers, and onions
- Alternative names: Three-bean salad, four-bean salad, etc.
- Type: Salad
- Main ingredients: Beans (green beans, yellow wax beans), chickpeas, kidney beans, onions, peppers or other vegetables

Bean salad is a common salad composed of various cooked beans—typically green, wax, kidney, and/or lima beans—tossed in a sweet-sour vinaigrette. Variant ingredients include fresh raw onions, bell pepper, and/or other cooked or raw vegetables, such as chickpeas.

Bean salad can also be prepared as a pickled dish, making it a popular choice for home canning. Salads prepared with this method should be used within a year for best quality.

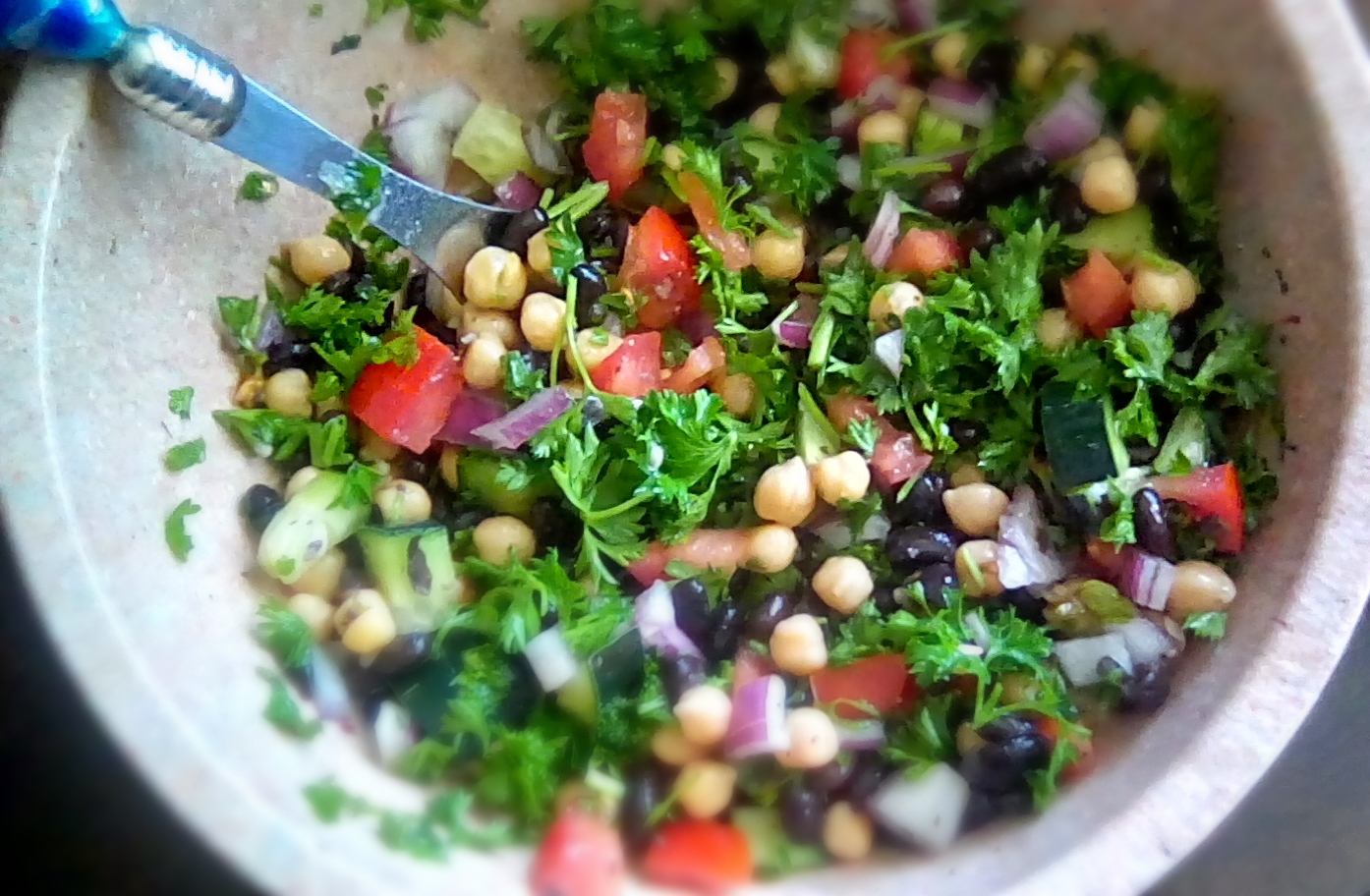
Balela, a Middle Eastern bean salad

Cultures around the world have their own version of bean salad. Balela is a Middle Eastern salad that typically uses chickpeas and black beans with tomatoes, herbs, parsley, and lemon juice. South American bean salad features poroto beans with tomatoes, parsley, oil and vinegar, and is served with grilled steak.

The dish is commonly known in the United States as "three-bean salad". The generic term “bean salad” may also include a starch such as barley, pasta, rice, or quinoa.

== History ==
Since at least the 19th century, salads using cooked beans have been commonly used for eating outside at parks and outings.

== Preparation and storage ==
The principal ingredients, the beans, have already been cooked and the vinaigrette helps to temporarily preserve the dish without refrigeration. If refrigerated, bean salad can last between three and five days and should be discarded when left out more than two hours. The absence of meat or dairy products in most recipes also allows this dish to keep longer than other food items that require consistent refrigeration and sealed storage.

== See also ==
- Ful medames salad – Egyptian dish of cooked fava beans
