= Helen Corbitt =

American chef and cookbook author

- Born: January 25, 1906; Benson, New York, US
- Died: January 16, 1978 (aged 71); Dallas, Texas, US
- Education: Skidmore College
- Occupations: Author, Chef
- Years active: 1925–1976
- Employer: Neiman Marcus (1955–1975)

Helen Corbitt (1906–1978) was an American chef and cookbook author. Corbitt was born in rural Saint Lawrence County New York but spent nearly 40 years in Texas promoting gourmet cuisine with new and unusual flavor combinations and serving temperatures. She traveled widely searching for new culinary inspiration. She was an early advocate of using the finest, freshest ingredients.

== Career ==
Corbitt moved to Austin in 1931 from her job as dietitian at Cornell Medical Center in New York City to become an instructor and manage the tearoom at the University of Texas. She was lured to the Houston Country Club before operating the tearoom at Joske's department store in Houston and had started her own catering business when the Driskill Hotel called her back to Austin.

The Neiman Marcus Kitchen Computer offered in 1969 with Helen Corbitt's recipes

In 1955, after being courted by Stanley Marcus for eight years, she joined Neiman-Marcus as Director of Food Services. Several of her recipes are still on the department store's menu, including her famous Poppy Seed Dressing. In the 1969 edition of its famously extravagant Christmas catalog, Neiman-Marcus advertised the Neiman Marcus Kitchen Computer, the first computer ever offered as a consumer product, with an option to purchase collections of Corbitt's recipes for use with the device. Corbitt left Neiman-Marcus in late 1969 to write, teach, and consult.

== Legacy ==
Corbitt authored numerous cookbooks and was the first woman to receive the Golden Plate Award, the highest honor in the food business. In 1969, she was presented the Outstanding Service Award by the Texas Restaurant Association for "her inestimable contributions" to the food service industry. A 1975 profile by the Chicago Tribune described Corbitt as "the Balenciaga of food and the best cook in Texas". In December 1999, Texas Monthly declared Corbitt to be the "Tastemaker of the Century". In 2009, the Los Angeles Times described her as "the Julia Child-esque cooking celebrity with a Texas twang".
