= William Crowther (programmer) =

Computer programmer and caver (born 1936)

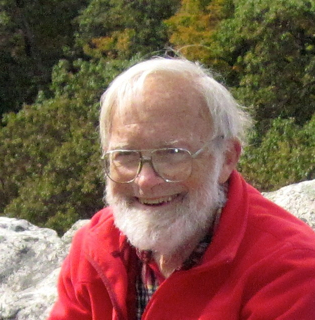
- Crowther in 2012
- Born: 1936 (age 89–90); United States
- Other names: Willie, Will
- Education: Massachusetts Institute of Technology (BS)
- Occupations: Computer programmer, caver
- Spouse(s): Patricia Crowther (until 1976), Nancy S. Crowther (married 1980-present)

William Crowther (born 1936) is an American computer programmer, caver, and rock climber. He is the co-creator of Colossal Cave Adventure from 1975 onward, a seminal computer game that influenced the first decade of video game design and inspired the text adventure game genre.

== Biography ==
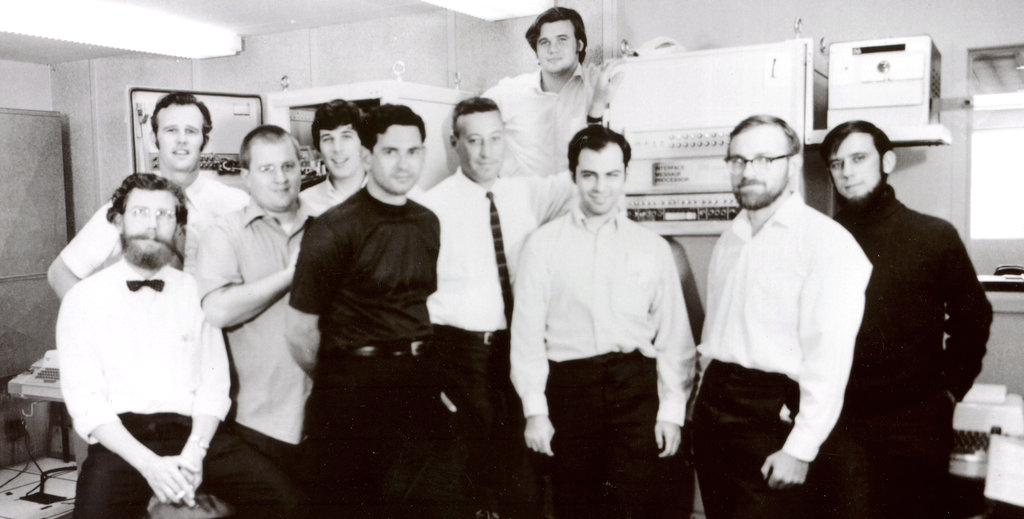
IMP Team (left to right): Truett Thatch, Bill Bartell, Dave Walden, Jim Geisman, Robert Kahn, Frank Heart, Ben Barker, Marty Thorpe, Will Crowther, Severo Ornstein

During the early 1970s, Crowther worked at defense contractor and internet-pioneer Bolt Beranek and Newman (BBN), where he was part of the original small ARPAnet development team. His implementation of a distributed distance vector routing system for the ARPAnet was an important early step in the evolution of the Internet.

Crowther met and married Pat Crowther while studying at the Massachusetts Institute of Technology, where he received a B.S. in physics in 1958.

=== Adventure ===
Following his divorce from his wife, Crowther used his spare time to develop a text-based adventure game in Fortran on BBN's PDP-10. He created it as a diversion his daughters Sandy and Laura could enjoy when they came to visit.

Crowther wrote:

I had been involved in a non-computer role-playing game called Dungeons and Dragons at the time, and also I had been actively exploring in caves - Mammoth Cave in Kentucky in particular. Suddenly, I got involved in a divorce, and that left me a bit pulled apart in various ways. In particular I was missing my kids. Also the caving had stopped, because that had become awkward, so I decided I would fool around and write a program that was a re-creation in fantasy of my caving, and also would be a game for the kids, and perhaps some aspects of the Dungeons and Dragons that I had been playing. My idea was that it would be a computer game that would not be intimidating to non-computer people, and that was one of the reasons why I made it so that the player directs the game with natural language input, instead of more standardized commands. My kids thought it was a lot of fun.

In Colossal Cave, or more simply called Adventure, the player moves around an imaginary cave system by entering simple, two-word commands and reading text describing the result. Crowther used his extensive knowledge of cave exploration as a basis for the gameplay, and there are many similarities between the locations in the game and those in Mammoth Cave, particularly its Bedquilt section. In 1975, Crowther released the game on the early ARPAnet system, of which BBN was a prime contractor.

In the spring of 1976, he was contacted by Stanford researcher Don Woods, seeking his permission to enhance the game. Crowther agreed, and Woods developed several enhanced versions on a PDP-10 housed in the Stanford Artificial Intelligence Laboratory (SAIL) where he worked. Over the following decade the game gained in popularity, being ported to many operating systems, including personal-computer platform CP/M.

The basic game structure invented by Crowther (and based in part on the example of the ELIZA text parser) was carried forward by the designers of later adventure games. Marc Blank and the team that created the Zork adventures cite Adventure as the title that inspired them to create their game. They later founded Infocom and published a series of popular text adventures.

=== Caving ===
The location of the game in Colossal Cave was not a coincidence. Crowther and his first wife Pat were active and dedicated cavers in the 1960s and early 1970s—both were part of many expeditions to connect the Mammoth and Flint Ridge cave systems. Pat played a key role in the September 9, 1972 expedition that finally made the connection. Indeed, even during his time working at BBN, his colleagues noticed that Crowther spent a fair amount of time doing chin-ups in doorframes, which apparently helped him concentrate.

As a member of the MIT Outing Club during the late 1950s and early 1960s, Crowther also played an important role in the development of rock climbing in the Shawangunks in New York State. He began climbing there in the 1950s and continues to climb. He made the first ascent of several classic routes including Arrow, Hawk, Moonlight, and Senté. Some of these routes sparked controversy because protection bolts were placed on rappel, a new tactic that Crowther and several others began to use at the time. The community reaction to this technique was an important part of the evolution of climbing ethics in the Shawangunks and beyond.

=== Later career ===
Crowther worked at Xerox PARC from 1976 to 1983. During this period he met and married Nancy Sanders Burnes in 1980 in Palo Alto, California. The two of them did a lot of rock climbing with friends in Yosemite and elsewhere. In 1983 he left Xerox and went back to Bolt Beranek and Newman in Cambridge, Massachusetts. He became active with the Appalachian Mountain Club and every year helped teach rock climbing to beginners. He continued doing that each spring until 2013.

In the 1990s, Cisco Systems bought the part of BBN where Crowther was working. He continued to work for Cisco until his retirement in 1997 to live in Delanson, New York with his second wife Nancy.

== See also ==
- Frank Heart
- Robert Kahn (computer scientist)
- Severo Ornstein

== Bibliography ==
- Dibbell, Julian: "A Marketable Wonder - Spelunking the American Imagination",
- Brucker, Roger W.; Watson, Richard A. (1976). The Longest Cave. New York: Knopf. ISBN 0-8093-1321-9.
- Montfort, Nick (2003). Twisty Little Passages: An Approach To Interactive Fiction. Cambridge: The MIT Press. ISBN 0-262-13436-5.
- Where Wizards Stay Up Late, by Katie Hafner and Matthew Lyon
- Hackers: Heroes of the Computer Revolution, by Steven Levy
- The Soul of a New Machine, by Tracy Kidder
- Computing in the Middle Ages: A View From the Trenches 1955-1983 by Severo Ornstein ISBN 978-1-4033-1517-5
- Peterson, Dale: "Genesis II: Creation and Recreation with Computers", (1983).
- IMP team photo, BBN
