= David Walden =

American computer scientist (1942–2022)

- Born: June 7, 1942; Longview, Washington, U.S.
- Died: April 27, 2022 (aged 79); East Sandwich, Massachusetts, U.S.
- Occupation: Computer scientist
- Known for: Packet switching technologies for ARPANET
- Spouse: Sara Elizabeth Cowles (m. 1966)

David Corydon Walden (June 7, 1942 – April 27, 2022) was an American computer scientist and Internet pioneer who contributed to the engineering development of the ARPANET, a precursor of the modern Internet. He specifically contributed to the Interface Message Processor, which was the packet switching node for the ARPANET. Walden was a contributor to IEEE Computer Society's Annals of the History of Computing and was a member of the TeX Users Group.

== Early life and education ==
Walden was born on June 7, 1942, to Velva (née Diede) and Clarence Walden in Longview, Washington. His mother was an elementary school teacher while his father was a high school teacher. His family moved to the San Francisco Bay Area when he was aged four. He started out at University of California, Berkeley, before dropping out with poor grades and subsequently moving to San Francisco State University, where he obtained a degree in mathematics. While at San Francisco State University, he took a course in numerical analysis, a field of mathematics, that triggered his interest in computers, and he worked on an IBM 1620 computer, the university's only computer.

== Career ==
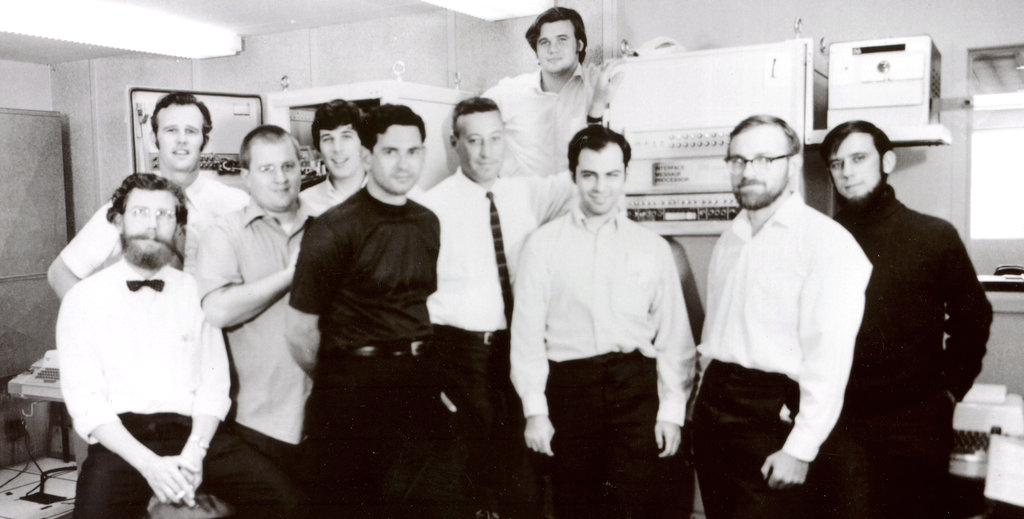
IMP team in 1969 (left to right): Truett Thatch, Bill Bartell (Honeywell), Dave Walden, Jim Geisman, Robert Kahn, Frank Heart, Ben Barker, Marty Thorpe, Will Crowther, and Severo Ornstein Not pictured: Bernie Cosell

Walden started his career working as a programmer at the space communications division of Massachusetts Institute of Technology's Lincoln Laboratory. He moved to join Bolt Beranek & Newman (BBN) in 1967. It was here that he was part of the seven-member engineering team that developed the packet switching technology that powered the ARPANET, one of the first general purpose computer networks that was a precursor of the modern internet. During his time at BBN, the group of engineers developed the Interface Message Processor, that formed the packet switching basis for the network, developed the hardware, wrote the software, and even acted as the Network Operations Center for the network. Specifically, Walden's efforts focused on developing the packet switching and routing software for the IMP.

He developed what became known as the "Walden message switching protocol", and was acknowledged by Vint Cerf and Bob Kahn in their seminal 1974 paper on internetworking, A Protocol For Packet Network Intercommunication.

Walden briefly moved to Norway to work at Norsk Data Elektronikk in Oslo, developing the LFK network, a Norwegian packet switching network, between 1970 and 1971, before returning to the United States to continue working with BBN. Walden was the system architect and Norsk Data's project manager in building out this network.

Toward the latter part of his career, Walden focused on management research and wrote extensively on the topic. He was also a member of the TeX Users Group and contributed to content related to digital typesetting and publishing. He had also served as the group's director and treasurer. Walden received an honorary doctorate from the San Francisco State University in 2014, for his contributions to the ARPANET. Walden was the co-founder of Center for Quality of Management and a contributor to IEEE Computer Society's Annals of the History of Computing and a member of its History Committee.

== Personal life ==
Walden married Sara Elizabeth Cowles, an educational administrator, in 1966. The couple had a son. Walden died of mantle cell lymphoma at his house in East Sandwich, Massachusetts, on April 27, 2022. He was aged 79.

== Select publications ==
- Walden, David (2003). "Looking back at the ARPANET effort, 34 years later - Internet History". LivingInternet.
- Walden, David (2014). "The Arpanet IMP Program: Retrospective and Resurrection". IEEE Annals of the History of Computing. 36 (2): 28–39. Bibcode:2014IAHC...13b..28D. doi:10.1109/MAHC.2014.30. ISSN 1934-1547. S2CID 16932766.
- Walden, David; Raymond S Nickerson, eds. (2011). A culture of innovation: insider accounts of computing and live at BBN. East Sandwich, MA: Waterside Publishing. ISBN 978-0-9789737-0-4. OCLC 778116299.
- Walden, David (1993). A new American TQM: four practical revolutions in management. et al. Cambridge, MA: Productivity Press. ISBN 978-1-56327-032-1. OCLC 27897718.
- Walden, David (2001). Four practical revolutions in management: systems for creating unique organizational capability. et al. Portland, OR: Productivity Press. ISBN 978-1-56327-217-2. OCLC 45487580.

== See also ==
- List of Internet pioneers
