= Severo Ornstein =

American computer scientist

Severo M. Ornstein (born 1930) is an American retired computer scientist and the son of composer Leo Ornstein. In 1955, he joined MIT's Lincoln Laboratory as a programmer and designer for the SAGE air-defense system. He later joined the TX-2 group and became a member of the team that designed the LINC. He moved with the team to Washington University in St. Louis where he was one of the principal designers of macromodules.

Returning to Boston he joined Bolt, Beranek and Newman. When ARPA issued a Request for Proposal for the ARPANET, he joined the group that wrote the winning proposal. He was responsible for the design of the communication interfaces and other special hardware for the Interface Message Processor. In 1972, he headed the first delegation of U.S. computer scientists to the People's Republic of China.

In 1976, he joined Xerox PARC where he implemented a computer interface to an early laser printer. Later he co-led (with Ed McCreight) the team that built the Dorado computer. Ornstein co-designed Mockingbird, the first interactive computer-based music-score editor, and oversaw its programming.

In 1980, he was instrumental in starting Computer Professionals for Social Responsibility (CPSR). He wrote an autobiography describing his experiences in computer science, published in 2002.

== See also ==
- Frank Heart
- Robert Kahn (computer scientist)
- William Crowther (programmer)
