= List of packet-switched networks =

This list of packet-switched networks is divided into three overlapping eras: early, isolated, networks before the introduction of X.25; the X.25 era when many postal, telephone, and telegraph (PTT) companies provided public data networks with worldwide reach; and the modern Internet era, which initially competed with the OSI model.

The work of Donald Davies in the late 1960s on data communication and computer network design became well known in the United States, Europe and Japan. This was the "cornerstone" that inspired numerous packet switching networks in the decade following.

== Early networks ==
The research and development of packet switching at the National Physical Laboratory (NPL) in the United Kingdom began with a proposal for a wide-area computer network in 1965, and a local-area network in 1966. In the United States, ARPANET funding was secured in 1966 by Bob Taylor, and planning began in 1967 when he hired Larry Roberts. Packeting switching was incorporated following the Symposium on Operating Systems Principles in 1967. The NPL network, followed by the ARPANET, became operational in 1969, the first two networks to use packet switching. Larry Roberts said many of the packet switching networks built in the 1970s were similar "in nearly all respects" to Donald Davies' original 1965 design. The ARPANET and Louis Pouzin's CYCLADES were the primary precursor networks of the modern Internet. CYCLADES, unlike ARPANET, was explicitly designed to research internetworking.

Two fundamental differences involved the division of functions and tasks between the hosts at the edge of the network and the network core. In the datagram, or connectionless, system, operating according to the end-to-end principle, the hosts have the responsibility to ensure orderly delivery of packets. In the virtual circuit, or connection-oriented, system, the network guarantees sequenced delivery of data to the host. This results in a simpler host interface but complicates the network.

=== AppleTalk ===
AppleTalk is a proprietary suite of networking protocols developed by Apple in 1985 for Apple Macintosh computers. It was the primary protocol used by Apple devices through the 1980s and 1990s. AppleTalk included features that allowed local area networks to be established ad hoc without the requirement for a centralized router or server. The AppleTalk system automatically assigned addresses, updated the distributed namespace, and configured any required inter-network routing. It was a plug-n-play system.

AppleTalk implementations were also released for the IBM PC and compatibles, and the Apple IIGS. AppleTalk support was available in most networked printers, especially laser printers, some file servers and routers.

The protocol was designed to be simple, autoconfiguring, and not require servers or other specialized services to work. These benefits also created drawbacks, as Appletalk tended not to use bandwidth efficiently. AppleTalk support was terminated in 2009.

=== ARPANET ===
The ARPANET was a progenitor network of the Internet and one of the first networks, along with ARPA's SATNET, to run the TCP/IP suite using packet switching technologies.

=== BNRNET ===
BNRNET was a network which Bell-Northern Research developed for internal use. It initially had only one host but was designed to support many hosts. BNR later made major contributions to the CCITT X.25 project.

=== Cambridge Ring ===
The Cambridge Ring was an experimental ring network developed at the Computer Laboratory, University of Cambridge. It operated from 1974 until the 1980s.

=== CompuServe ===
CompuServe developed its own packet switching network, implemented on DEC PDP-11 minicomputers acting as network nodes that were installed throughout the US (and later, in other countries) and interconnected. Over time, the CompuServe network evolved into a complicated multi-tiered network incorporating ATM, Frame Relay, IP and X.25 technologies.

=== CYCLADES ===
The CYCLADES packet switching network was a French research network designed and directed by Louis Pouzin. First demonstrated in 1973, it was developed to explore alternatives to the early ARPANET design and to support network research generally. It was the first network to use the end-to-end principle and make the hosts responsible for reliable delivery of data, rather than the network itself. Concepts of this network influenced later ARPANET architecture.

=== DECnet ===
DECnet is a suite of network protocols created by Digital Equipment Corporation, originally released in 1975 in order to connect two PDP-11 minicomputers. It evolved into one of the first peer-to-peer network architectures, thus transforming DEC into a networking powerhouse in the 1980s. Initially built with three layers, it later (1982) evolved into a seven-layer OSI-compliant networking protocol. The DECnet protocols were designed entirely by Digital Equipment Corporation. However, DECnet Phase II (and later) were open standards with published specifications, and several implementations were developed outside DEC, including one for Linux.

=== DDX-1 ===
DDX-1 was an experimental network from Nippon PTT. It mixed circuit switching and packet switching. It was succeeded by DDX-2.

=== EIN ===
The European Informatics Network (EIN), originally called COST 11, was a project beginning in 1971 to link networks in Britain, France, Italy, Switzerland and Euratom. Six other European countries also participated in the research on network protocols. Derek Barber directed the project, and Roger Scantlebury led the UK technical contribution; both were from NPL. The contract for its implementation was awarded to an Anglo French consortium led by the UK systems house Logica and Sesa and managed by Andrew Karney. Work began in 1973 and it became operational in 1976 including nodes linking the NPL network and CYCLADES. Barber proposed and implemented a mail protocol for EIN. The transport protocol of the EIN helped to launch the INWG and X.25 protocols. EIN was replaced by Euronet in 1979.

=== EPSS ===
The Experimental Packet Switched Service (EPSS) was an experiment of the UK Post Office Telecommunications. It was the first public data network in the UK when it began operating in 1976. Ferranti supplied the hardware and software. The handling of link control messages (acknowledgements and flow control) was different from that of most other networks.

=== GEIS ===
As General Electric Information Services (GEIS), General Electric was a major international provider of information services. The company originally designed a telephone network to serve as its internal (albeit continent-wide) voice telephone network.

In 1965, at the instigation of Warner Sinback, a data network based on this voice-phone network was designed to connect GE's four computer sales and service centers (Schenectady, New York, Chicago, and Phoenix) to facilitate a computer time-sharing service.

After going international some years later, GEIS created a network data center near Cleveland, Ohio. Very little has been published about the internal details of their network. The design was hierarchical with redundant communication links.

=== IPSANET ===
IPSANET was a semi-private network constructed by I. P. Sharp Associates to serve their time-sharing customers. It became operational in May 1976.

=== IPX/SPX ===
The Internetwork Packet Exchange (IPX) and Sequenced Packet Exchange (SPX) are Novell networking protocols from the 1980s derived from Xerox Network Systems' IDP and SPP protocols, respectively which date back to the 1970s. IPX/SPX was used primarily on networks using the Novell NetWare operating systems.

=== Merit Network ===
Merit Network, an independent nonprofit organization governed by Michigan's public universities, was formed in 1966 as the Michigan Educational Research Information Triad to explore computer networking between three of Michigan's public universities as a means to help the state's educational and economic development. With initial support from the State of Michigan and the National Science Foundation (NSF), the packet-switched network was first demonstrated in December 1971 when an interactive host-to-host connection was made between the IBM mainframe systems at the University of Michigan in Ann Arbor and Wayne State University in Detroit. In October 1972, connections to the CDC mainframe at Michigan State University in East Lansing completed the triad. Over the next several years, in addition to host-to-host interactive connections, the network was enhanced to support terminal-to-host connections, host-to-host batch connections (remote job submission, remote printing, batch file transfer), interactive file transfer, gateways to the Tymnet and Telenet public data networks, X.25 host attachments, gateways to X.25 data networks, Ethernet attached hosts, and eventually TCP/IP; additionally, public universities in Michigan joined the network. All of this set the stage for Merit's role in the NSFNET project starting in the mid-1980s.

=== NPL ===
Donald Davies of the National Physical Laboratory (United Kingdom) designed and proposed a national commercial data network based on packet switching in 1965. The proposal was not taken up nationally but the following year, he designed a local network using "interface computers", today known as routers, to serve the needs of NPL and prove the feasibility of packet switching.

By 1968 Davies had begun building the NPL network to meet the needs of the multidisciplinary laboratory and prove the technology under operational conditions. In 1969, the NPL, followed by the ARPANET, were the first two networks to use packet switching. By 1976, 12 computers and 75 terminal devices were attached, and more were added until the network was replaced in 1986. NPL was the first to use high-speed links.

=== Octopus ===
Octopus was a local network at Lawrence Livermore National Laboratory. It connected sundry hosts at the lab to interactive terminals and various computer peripherals including a bulk storage system.

=== Philips Research ===
Philips Research Laboratories in Redhill, Surrey developed a packet switching network for internal use. It was a datagram network with a single switching node.

=== PUP ===
PARC Universal Packet (PUP or Pup) was one of the two earliest internetworking protocol suites; it was created by researchers at Xerox PARC in the mid-1970s. The entire suite provided routing and packet delivery, as well as higher level functions such as a reliable byte stream, along with numerous applications. Further developments led to Xerox Network Systems (XNS).

=== RCP ===
RCP was an experimental network created by the French PTT. It was used to gain experience with packet switching technology before the specification of the TRANSPAC public network was frozen. RCP was a virtual-circuit network in contrast to CYCLADES which was based on datagrams. RCP emphasised terminal-to-host and terminal-to-terminal connection; CYCLADES was concerned with host-to-host communication. RCP influenced the X.25 specification, which was deployed on TRANSPAC and other public data networks.

=== RETD ===
Red Especial de Transmisión de Datos (RETD) was a network developed by Compañía Telefónica Nacional de España. It became operational in 1972 and thus was the first public network.

=== SCANNET ===
"The experimental packet-switched Nordic telecommunication network SCANNET was implemented in Nordic technical libraries in the 1970s, and it included first Nordic electronic journal Extemplo. Libraries were also among first ones in universities to accommodate microcomputers for public use in the early 1980s."

=== SITA HLN ===
SITA is a consortium of airlines. Its High Level Network (HLN) became operational in 1969. Although organised to act like a packet-switching network, it still used message switching. As with many non-academic networks, very little has been published about it.

=== SRCnet/SERCnet ===
A number of computer facilities serving the Science Research Council (SRC) community in the United Kingdom developed beginning in the early 1970s. Each had their own star network (ULCC London, UMRCC Manchester, Rutherford Appleton Laboratory). There were also regional networks centred on Bristol (on which work was initiated in the late 1960s) followed in the mid-late 1970s by Edinburgh, the Midlands and Newcastle. These groups of institutions shared resources to provide better computing facilities than could be afforded individually. The networks were each based on one manufacturer's standards and were mutually incompatible and overlapping. In 1981, the SRC was renamed the Science and Engineering Research Council (SERC). In the early 1980s a standardisation and interconnection effort started, hosted on an expansion of the SERCnet research network and based on the Coloured Book protocols, later evolving into JANET.

=== Systems Network Architecture ===
Systems Network Architecture (SNA) is IBM's proprietary networking architecture created in 1974. An IBM customer could acquire hardware and software from IBM and lease private lines from a common carrier to construct a private network.

=== Telenet ===
Telenet was the first FCC-licensed public data network in the United States. Telenet was incorporated in 1973 and started operations in 1975. It was founded by Bolt Beranek & Newman with Larry Roberts as CEO as a means of making packet switching technology public. Telenet initially used a proprietary Virtual circuit host interface, but changed it to X.25 and the terminal interface to X.29 after their standardization in CCITT. It went public in 1979 and was then sold to GTE.

=== Tymnet ===
Tymnet was an international data communications network headquartered in San Jose, California. In 1969, it began install a network based on minicomputers to connect timesharing terminals to its central computers. The network used store-and-forward and voice-grade lines. Routing was not distributed, rather it was established by a central supervisor on a call-by-call basis.

== X.25 era ==
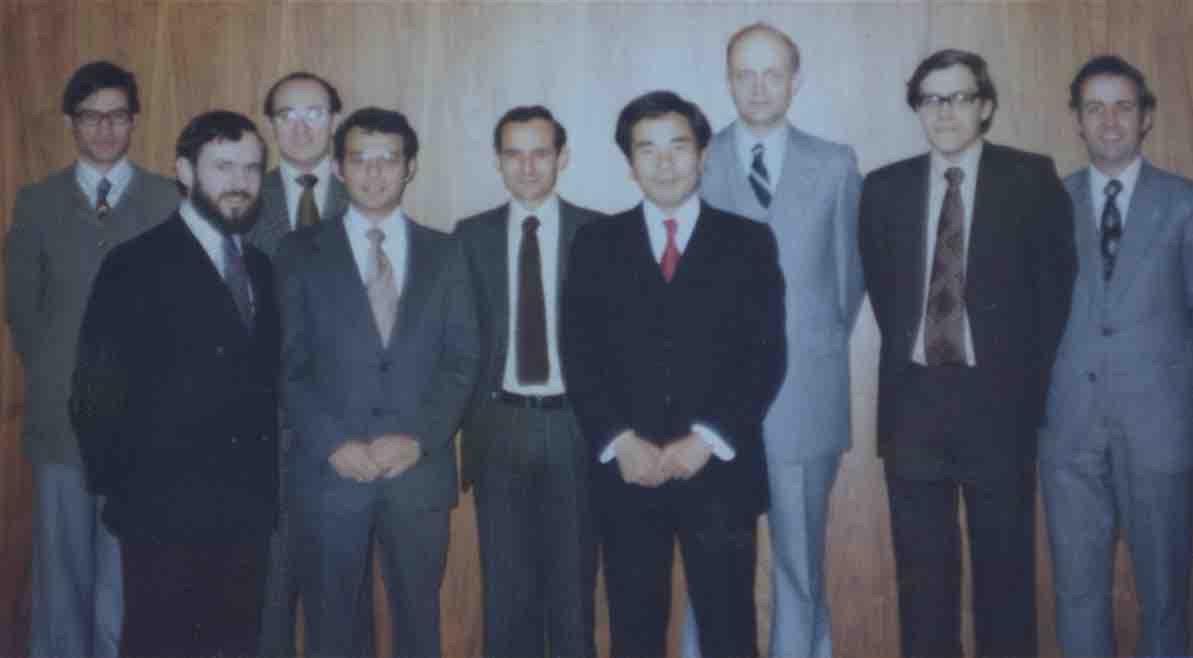
CCITT SGVII X25 Advocates

Prior to the introduction of X.25 in 1976, about twenty different network technologies had been developed. X.25 was developed based on the virtual circuit approach. There were two kinds of X.25 networks. Some such as DATAPAC and TRANSPAC were initially implemented with an X.25 external interface. Some older networks such as TELENET and TYMNET were modified to provide an X.25 host interface in addition to older host connection schemes. DATAPAC was developed by Bell-Northern Research which was a joint venture of Bell Canada (a common carrier) and Northern Telecom (a telecommunications equipment supplier). Northern Telecom sold several DATAPAC clones to foreign PTTs including the Deutsche Bundespost. X.75 and X.121 allowed the interconnection of national X.25 networks.

=== AUSTPAC ===
AUSTPAC was an Australian public X.25 network operated by Telstra. Established by Telstra's predecessor Telecom Australia in the early 1980s, AUSTPAC was Australia's first public packet-switched data network and supported applications such as on-line betting, financial applications—the Australian Taxation Office made use of AUSTPAC—and remote terminal access to academic institutions, who maintained their connections to AUSTPAC up until the mid-late 1990s in some cases. Access was via a dial-up terminal to a PAD, or, by linking a permanent X.25 node to the network.

=== ConnNet ===
ConnNet was a network operated by the Southern New England Telephone Company serving the state of Connecticut. Launched on March 11, 1985, it was the first local public packet-switched network in the United States.

=== Datanet 1 ===
Datanet 1 was the public switched data network operated by the Dutch PTT Telecom (now known as KPN). Strictly speaking Datanet 1 only referred to the network and the connected users via leased lines (using the X.121 DNIC 2041), the name also referred to the public PAD service Telepad (using the DNIC 2049). And because the main Videotex service used the network and modified PAD devices as infrastructure the name Datanet 1 was used for these services as well.

=== DATAPAC ===
DATAPAC was the first operational X.25 network (1976). It covered major Canadian cities and was eventually extended to smaller centers.

=== Datex-P ===
Deutsche Bundespost operated the Datex-P national network in Germany. The technology was acquired from Northern Telecom.

=== Eirpac ===
Eirpac is the Irish public switched data network supporting X.25 and X.28. It was launched in 1984, replacing Euronet. Eirpac is run by Eircom.

=== Euronet ===
Nine member states of the European Economic Community contracted with Logica and the French company SESA to set up a joint venture in 1975 to undertake the Euronet development, using X.25 protocols to form virtual circuits. It was to replace EIN and established a network in 1979 linking a number of European countries until 1984 when the network was handed over to national PTTs.

=== HIPA-NET ===
Hitachi designed a private network system for sale as a turnkey package to multi-national organizations. In addition to providing X.25 packet switching, message switching software was also included. Messages were buffered at the nodes adjacent to the sending and receiving terminals. Switched virtual calls were not supported, but through the use of logical ports an originating terminal could have a menu of pre-defined destination terminals.

=== Iberpac ===
Iberpac is the Spanish public packet-switched network, providing X.25 services. It was based on RETD which was operational since 1972. Iberpac was run by Telefonica.

=== IPSS ===
In 1978, X.25 provided the first international and commercial packet-switching network, the International Packet Switched Service (IPSS).

=== JANET ===
JANET was the UK academic and research network, linking all universities, higher education establishments, and publicly funded research laboratories following its launch in 1984. The X.25 network, which used the Coloured Book protocols, was based mainly on GEC 4000 series switches, and ran X.25 links at up to 8 Mbit/s in its final phase before being converted to an IP-based network in 1991. The JANET network grew out of the 1970s SRCnet, later called SERCnet.

=== PSS ===
Packet Switch Stream (PSS) was the Post Office Telecommunications (later to become British Telecom) national X.25 network with a DNIC of 2342. British Telecom renamed PSS Global Network Service (GNS), but the PSS name has remained better known. PSS also included public dial-up PAD access, and various InterStream gateways to other services such as Telex.

=== REXPAC ===
REXPAC was the nationwide experimental packet switching data network in Brazil, developed by the research and development center of Telebrás, the state-owned public telecommunications provider.

=== SITA Data Transport Network ===
SITA is a consortium of airlines. Its Data Transport Network adopted X.25 in 1981, becoming the world's most extensive packet-switching network. As with many non-academic networks, very little has been published about it.

=== TRANSPAC ===
TRANSPAC was the national X.25 network in France. It was developed locally at about the same time as DATAPAC in Canada. The development was done by the French PTT and influenced by its preceding experimental network RCP. It began operation in 1978, and served commercial users and, after Minitel began, consumers.

=== Tymnet ===
Tymnet utilized virtual call packet switched technology including X.25, SNA/SDLC, BSC and ASCII interfaces to connect host computers (servers) at thousands of large companies, educational institutions, and government agencies. Users typically connected via dial-up connections or dedicated asynchronous serial connections. The business consisted of a large public network that supported dial-up users and a private network business that allowed government agencies and large companies (mostly banks and airlines) to build their own dedicated networks. The private networks were often connected via gateways to the public network to reach locations not on the private network. Tymnet was also connected to dozens of other public networks in the U.S. and internationally via X.25/X.75 gateways.

=== UNINETT ===
UNINETT was a wide-area Norwegian packet-switched network established through a joint effort between Norwegian universities, research institutions and the Norwegian Telecommunication administration. The original network was based on X.25; Internet protocols were adopted later.

=== VENUS-P ===
VENUS-P was an international X.25 network that operated from April 1982 through March 2006. At its subscription peak in 1999, VENUS-P connected 207 networks in 87 countries.

=== XNS ===
Xerox Network Systems (XNS) was a protocol suite promulgated by Xerox, which provided routing and packet delivery, as well as higher-level functions such as a reliable stream, and remote procedure calls. It was developed from PARC Universal Packet (PUP).

== Internet era ==
When Internet connectivity was made available to anyone who could pay for an Internet service provider subscription, the distinctions between national networks blurred. The user no longer saw network identifiers such as the DNIC. Some older technologies such as circuit switching have resurfaced with new names such as fast packet switching. For a period in the 1980s and early 1990s, the Internet Protocol Suite initially competed with the OSI model. Researchers have created some experimental networks to complement the existing Internet.

=== CSNET ===
The Computer Science Network (CSNET) was a computer network funded by the NSF that began operation in 1981. Its purpose was to extend networking benefits for computer science departments at academic and research institutions that could not be directly connected to ARPANET due to funding or authorization limitations. It played a significant role in spreading awareness of, and access to, national networking and was a major milestone on the path to the development of the global Internet.

=== Internet2 ===
Internet2 is a not-for-profit United States computer networking consortium led by members from the research and education communities, industry, and government. The Internet2 community, in partnership with Qwest, built the first Internet2 Network, called Abilene, in 1998 and was a prime investor in the National LambdaRail (NLR) project. In 2006, Internet2 announced a partnership with Level 3 Communications to launch a brand new nationwide network, boosting its capacity from 10 to 100 Gbit/s. In October, 2007, Internet2 officially retired Abilene and now refers to its new, higher capacity network as the Internet2 Network.

=== NSFNET ===
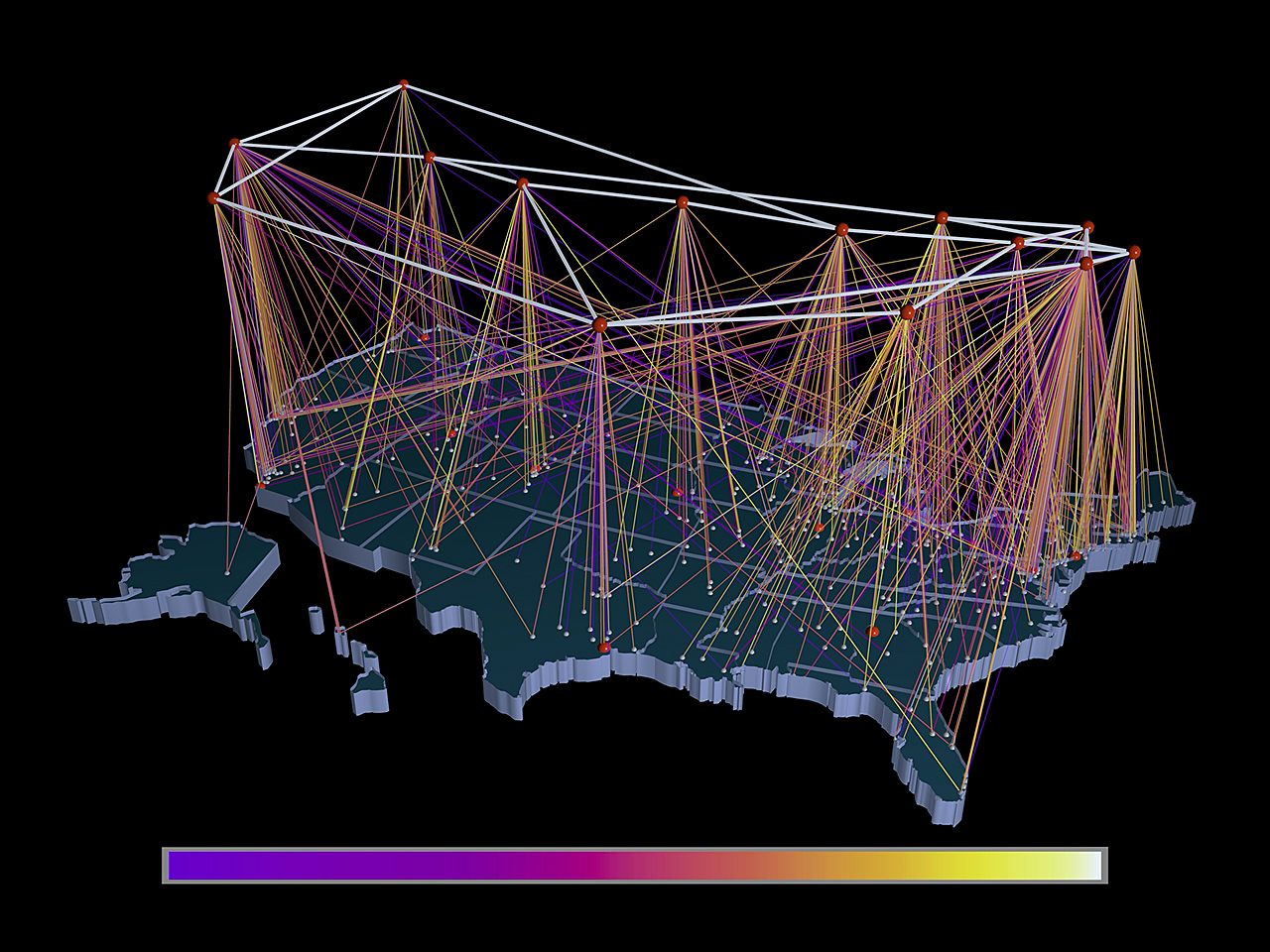
NSFNET Traffic 1991, NSFNET backbone nodes are shown at the top, regional networks below, traffic volume is depicted from purple (zero bytes) to white (100 billion bytes), visualization by NCSA using traffic data provided by the Merit Network.

The National Science Foundation Network (NSFNET) was a program of coordinated, evolving projects sponsored by the NSF beginning in 1985 to promote advanced research and education networking in the United States. NSFNET was also the name given to several nationwide backbone networks, operating at speeds of 56 kbit/s, 1.5 Mbit/s (T1), and 45 Mbit/s (T3), that were constructed to support NSF's networking initiatives from 1985 to 1995. Initially created to link researchers to the nation's NSF-funded supercomputing centers, through further public funding and private industry partnerships it developed into a major part of the Internet backbone.

=== NSFNET regional networks ===
In addition to the five NSF supercomputer centers, NSFNET provided connectivity to eleven regional networks and through these networks to many smaller regional and campus networks in the United States. The NSFNET regional networks were:

- BARRNet, the Bay Area Regional Research Network in Palo Alto, California;
- CERFnet, California Education and Research Federation Network in San Diego, California, serving California and Nevada;
- CICNet, the Committee on Institutional Cooperation Network via the Merit Network in Ann Arbor, Michigan and later as part of the T3 upgrade via Argonne National Laboratory outside of Chicago, serving the Big Ten Universities and the University of Chicago in Illinois, Indiana, Michigan, Minnesota, Ohio, and Wisconsin;
- Merit/MichNet in Ann Arbor, Michigan serving Michigan, formed in 1966, still in operation as of 2023;
- MIDnet in Lincoln, Nebraska serving Arkansas, Iowa, Kansas, Missouri, Nebraska, Oklahoma, and South Dakota;
- NEARNET, the New England Academic and Research Network in Cambridge, Massachusetts, added as part of the upgrade to T3, serving Connecticut, Maine, Massachusetts, New Hampshire, Rhode Island, and Vermont, established in late 1988, operated by BBN under contract to MIT, BBN assumed responsibility for NEARNET on 1 July 1993;
- NorthWestNet in Seattle, Washington, serving Alaska, Idaho, Montana, North Dakota, Oregon, and Washington, founded in 1987;
- NYSERNet, New York State Education and Research Network in Ithaca, New York;
- JVNCNet, the John von Neumann National Supercomputer Center Network in Princeton, New Jersey, serving Delaware and New Jersey;
- SESQUINET, the Sesquicentennial Network in Houston, Texas, founded during the 150th anniversary of the State of Texas;
- SURAnet, the Southeastern Universities Research Association network in College Park, Maryland and later as part of the T3 upgrade in Atlanta, Georgia serving Alabama, Florida, Georgia, Kentucky, Louisiana, Maryland, Mississippi, North Carolina, South Carolina, Tennessee, Virginia, and West Virginia, sold to BBN in 1994; and
- Westnet in Salt Lake City, Utah and Boulder, Colorado, serving Arizona, Colorado, New Mexico, Utah, and Wyoming.

=== National LambdaRail ===
The National LambdaRail (NRL) was launched in September 2003. It is a 12,000-mile high-speed national computer network owned and operated by the US research and education community that runs over fiber-optic lines. It was the first transcontinental 10 Gigabit Ethernet network. It operates with an aggregate capacity of up to 1.6 Tbit/s and a 40 Gbit/s bitrate. NLR ceased operations in March 2014.

=== TransPAC2, and TransPAC3 ===
TransPAC2 is a high-speed international Internet service connecting research and education networks in the Asia-Pacific region to those in the US. TransPAC3 is part of the NSF's International Research Network Connections (IRNC) program.

=== Very high-speed Backbone Network Service (vBNS) ===
The Very high-speed Backbone Network Service (vBNS) came on line in April 1995 as part of a NSF sponsored project to provide high-speed interconnection between NSF-sponsored supercomputing centers and select access points in the United States. The network was engineered and operated by MCI Telecommunications under a cooperative agreement with the NSF. By 1998, the vBNS had grown to connect more than 100 universities and research and engineering institutions via 12 national points of presence with DS-3 (45 Mbit/s), OC-3c (155 Mbit/s), and OC-12 (622 Mbit/s) links on an all OC-12 backbone, a substantial engineering feat for that time. The vBNS installed one of the first ever production OC-48 (2.5 Gbit/s) IP links in February 1999 and went on to upgrade the entire backbone to OC-48.

In June 1999 MCI WorldCom introduced vBNS+ which allowed attachments to the vBNS network by organizations that were not approved by or receiving support from NSF. After the expiration of the NSF agreement, the vBNS largely transitioned to providing service to the government. Most universities and research centers migrated to the Internet2 educational backbone. In January 2006, when MCI and Verizon merged, vBNS+ became a service of Verizon Business.

== See also ==
- History of the Internet
- Timeline of the history of the Internet
