= Packet Switch Stream =

British packet-switched network

Packet Switch Stream (PSS) was a public data network in the United Kingdom, provided by British Telecommunications (BT). It operated from the late 1970s through to the mid-2000s.

== Research, development and implementation ==
=== EPSS ===
Roger Scantlebury was seconded from the National Physical Laboratory to the British Post Office Telecommunications division (BPO-T) in 1969. He had worked with Donald Davies in the late 1960s pioneering the first implementation of packet switching and the associated communication protocols on the local-area NPL network. By 1973, BPO-T engineers had developed a packet-switching communication protocol from basic principles for an Experimental Packet Switched Service (EPSS) based on a virtual call capability. However, the protocols were complex and limited; Donald Davies described them as "esoteric".

Ferranti supplied the hardware and software. The handling of link control messages (acknowledgements and flow control) was different from that of most other networks. The EPSS began operating in 1976, the first public data network in the UK. EPSS was interconnected with SATNET and the NPL network.

=== IPSS ===
The International Packet Switched Service (IPSS) was an international network service, based on the X.25 standard, launched by the international division of BT. This venture was driven by the high demand for affordable access to US-based database and other network services. A service was provided by IPSS to this market, which started operation in 1978. IPSS was later linked to PSS and other packet switched networks around the world using gateways based on the X.75 standard.

IPSS was interconnected with SATNET. JANET connections were available via IPSS.

=== PSS ===
A period of pre-operational testing with customers, mainly UK universities and computer manufacturers, began in 1980. Packet Switch Stream launched as a commercial service on 20 August 1981 based on X.25/X.75. The experimental predecessor network (EPSS) formally closed down on 31 July 1981 after all the existing connections had been moved to PSS.

The network was initially based upon a dedicated modular packet switch using DCC's TP 4000 communication processor hardware. The operating system and the packet switching software were developed by Telenet (later on GTE Telenet). BT bought Telenet's system via Plessey Controls of Poole, Dorset who also sold Telex and traffic light systems. PSS was launched before Telenet's own upgrade of its network and, at the time, most other networks still used general purpose mini-computers as packet switches.

For a brief time the EEC operated a packet switched network, Euronet, and a related project Diane to encourage more database and network services to develop in Europe. These connections moved over to PSS and other European networks as commercial X.25 services launched.

Later on the InterStream gateway between the Telex network and PSS was introduced based on a low speed PAD interface.

In addition, BT used Telematics packet switches for the Vascom network to support the Prestel service.

The network management systems were based in London and Manchester. Packet switches were installed at major trunk exchanges in most major conurbations in the UK. Network management was run on a system of 24 Prime 63xx and 48xx computers running a modified versions of Revisions 20 and 22 of the Primos operating system.

The DNICs used by IPSS and PSS were 2341 and 2342 respectively.

The last PSS node in the UK was finally switched off Wednesday, 28 June 2006.

== Description ==
Companies and individual users could connect into the PSS network using the full X.25 interface, via a dedicated four-wire telephone circuit using a PSS analog modem and later on, when problems of 10-100 ms transmission failures with the PCM Voice based transmission equipment used by the early Kilostream service were resolved, via a Kilostream digital access circuit (actually a baseband modem). In this early 1980s era installation lead times for suitable 4-wire analog lines could be more than 6 months in the UK.

Companies and individual users could also connect into the PSS network using a basic non-error correcting RS232/V.24 asynchronous character based interface via an X.3/X.28/X.29 PAD (Packet Assembler/Disassembler) service oriented to the then prevalent dumb terminal market place. The PAD service could be connected to via a dedicated four-wire telephone circuit using a PSS analog modem and later on via a Kilostream digital access circuit. However most customers, for cost reasons, chose to dial up via an analog modem over the then UK analog telephony network to their nearest public PAD, via published phone numbers, using an ID/password provided as a subscription service.

The current day analogy of ISPs offering broadband always on and dial up services to the internet applies here. Some customers connected to the PSS network via the X.25 service and bought their own PADs. PSS was one of the first telecommunications networks in the UK to be fully liberalised in that customers could connect their own equipment to the network. This was before privatisation and the creation of British Telecommunications plc (BT) in 1984.

=== Connectivity to databases and mainframe systems ===
PSS could be used to connect to a variety of online databases and mainframe systems. Of particular note was the use of PSS for the first networked Clearing House Automated Payment System (CHAPS). This was a network system used to transfer all payments over £10,000 GBP (in early 1980s monetary value) between the major UK banks and other major financial institutions based in the UK. It replaced a paper based system that operated in the City of London using electrical vehicles similar to milk floats. Logica (now LogicaCMG) designed the CHAPS system and incorporated an encryption system able to cope with HDLC bit stuffing on X.25 links.

=== Speeds ===
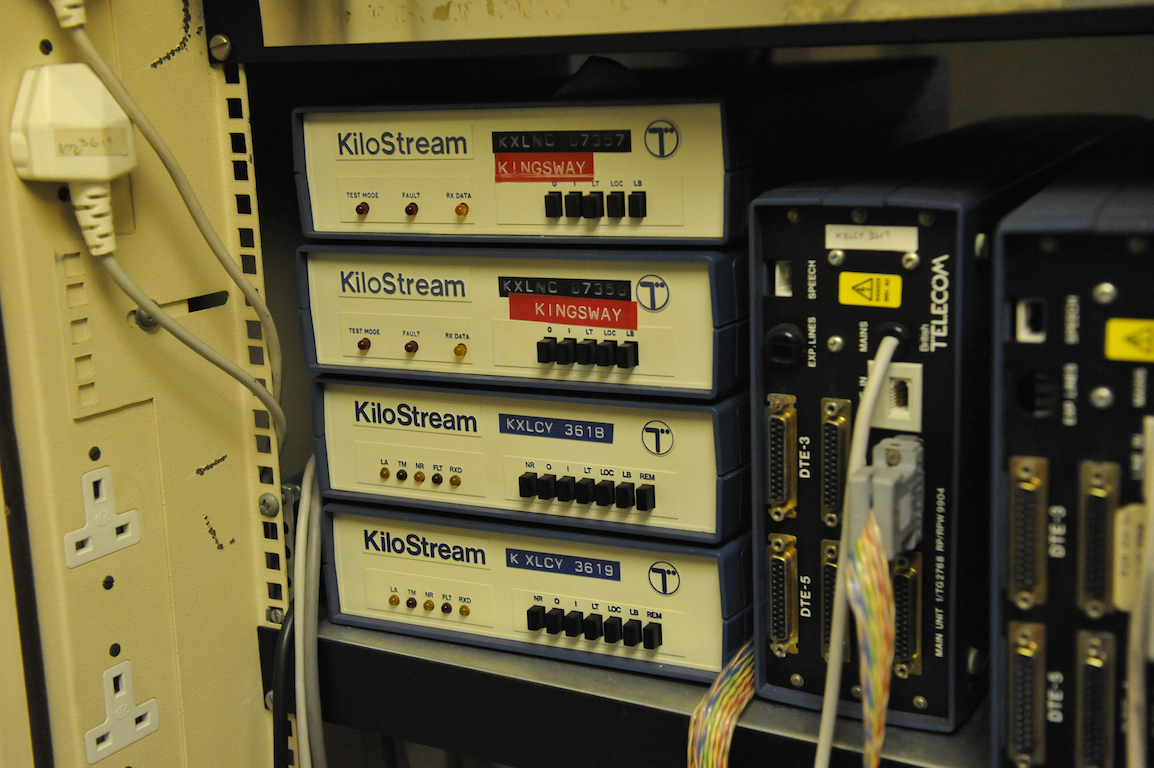
BT KiloStream equipment in a telephone exchange in 2004

There was a choice of different speeds of PSS lines; the faster the line the more expensive it cost to rent it. The highest and lowest speed lines were provided by the Megastream and Kilostream services, 2M (Mega) bit/s and 256K (kilo) bit/s respectively. On analog links 2400 bit/s, 4800 bit/s, 9600 bit/s and 48 kbit/s were offered. Individual users could link into PSS, on a pay as you go basis, by using a 110, 300, 1200/75, 1,200 or 2,400 bit/s PSTN modem to connect a Data Terminal Equipment terminal into a local PSS exchange. Note: in those days 2,400 bit/s modems were quite rare; 1,200 bit/s was the usual speed in the 1980s, although 110 and 300 bit/s modems were not uncommon.

== Investment challenges ==
=== Early years ===
PSS suffered from inconsistent investment during its early years. Sometimes not enough and sometimes too much but mostly for the wrong reasons. BT's attitude to packet switching was ambivalent at best. France's Transpac had a separate commercial company with dedicated management and saw X.25 packet switching as a core offering. BT's then senior management regarded packet switching as a passing phase until the telecommunications nirvana of ISDN's 64 kbit/s for everyone arrived.

=== Tymnet acquisition and exchange for other assets ===
BT bought the Tymnet network from McDonnell Douglas. BT subsequently exchanged major US elements of the Tymnet business with MCI for other assets when the proposed merger of their two businesses was thwarted by MCI's purchase by WorldCom.

In the words of BT's own history:

British Telecom purchased the Tymnet network systems business and its associated applications activities from the McDonnell Douglas Corporation on 19 November (1989) for $355 million. Its activities included TYMNET, the public network business, plus its associates private and hybrid (mixed public and private) network activities, the OnTyme electronic mail service, the Card Service processing business, and EDI*Net, the US market leader in electronic data interchange.

BT Tymnet anticipated developing an end to end managed network service for multi-national customers, and developing dedicated or hybrid networks that embraced major trading areas. Customers would be able to enjoy one-stop-shopping for global data networks, and a portfolio of products designed for a global market place.

These services were subsequently offered by BT Global Network Services, and subsequently by Concert as part of Concert Global Network Services after the Concert joint venture company was launched on 15 June 1994.

=== Later years ===
Even in later years, BT's senior management stated that the Internet was "not fit for purpose".

Investments in value added network services (VANS) and BT's own access level packet switching hardware delayed operating profit. This in turn dented PSS's low credibility with BT's management still further. Despite healthy demand for basic X.25 services and the obvious trend for more demanding bandwidth intensive applications that required investment in more powerful switches a decision to develop BT's own hardware and network applications was made instead.

In the midst of this IBM (the then market leader in computing) and BT attempted to launch a joint venture, called Jove, for managed SNA services in the UK. And for a time significant extra expenditure was allowed for BT's data services, PSS being the major part, as one concern of regulators was this joint venture might damage work on Open Systems Interconnection. This only made cost control worse and achieving operating profit delayed further. Eventually the UK government decided the SNA joint venture was anti-competitive and vetoed it. But not before PSS management was allowed to commit to large investments that caused serious problems later.

One of the few successful value added applications was the transaction phone used to check credit cards by retailer to validate transactions and prevent fraud. It was believed that putting a packet switch in every local telephone exchange would allow this and other low bandwidth applications to drive revenue. The lesson of Tymnet's similar transaction phone that just used a dial up link to a standard PAD based service was not followed. Each low end packet switch installed added costs for floor space, power, etc. without any significant value added revenue benefit resulting. Nor were they adequate for X.25 host traffic.

Ideas such as providing a menu based interface, called Epad, more user-friendly than X.28 was proven obsolete by the advent of Windows-based clients on PCs.

As the added value services, named PSS Plus collectively, added significant costs and headcount while contributed virtually no revenue a change in PSS's management eventually resulted. While a decision was eventually made to put some of the basic network services people in senior positions and try to launch what had been developed this proved to be a major mistake. An exodus of people who were developing the value added network services helped reduce some costs. However significant on-going expenditure had been committed already to manufacture packet switch hardware and by using the very expensive Tandem computers in existing VANS. Operating profit was still not achieved and a further change in management with McKinsey consulting being called in.

McKinsey's recommendation that increasing revenue while cutting costs was required to turn around the business was duly followed by the new management and an operating profit achieved in about 1988. This rested on running PSS efficiently and cutting the VANS as much as possible. PSS was then merged with other failing business like Prestel as it became part of a larger Managed Network Services division that was used to fix or close BT's problem businesses.

== Legacy ==
=== Communication protocols ===
Researchers on EPSS in the UK and elsewhere identified the need for defining higher-level protocols. The UK National Computing Centre publication 'Why Distributed Computing', which was based on extensive research into future potential configurations for computer systems. This resulted in the UK presenting the case for an international standards committee to cover this area at the ISO meeting in Sydney in March 1977. This work led to the OSI reference model in 1984 and the subsequent Internet-OSI Standards War.

=== Commercial ===
While PSS eventually went the way of all X.25 networks and was overwhelmed by the internet and more significantly the internet's superior application suite and cost model, BT did not capitalise as much as other packet switch operators by subsequent mistakes concerning the internet, Tymnet, BT's North American operations and the Concert Global Services with ATT.

BT's failure to become the major ISP in its own home market unlike every other former PTT and the success of Dixon's Freeserve, Demon and Energis based virtual ISPs in the same sector has only been recovered from recently. Only after BT changed its most senior management who were fixated on circuit switching/ISDN based on System X/Y telephone exchanges and embracing broadband/internet lock stock and barrel has this changed. An emergency rights issue also helped resolve the debt from acquiring second or third ranked old telcos style companies around the world.

Now BT appears to be inheriting a dominating position in the Global Network Services market, based on packet switching, as CSC and Reuters sell up their networks to BT. As the commodity price of IP services based in their core 21st century MPLS network to carry voice and data that gives them the real cost efficiencies from packet switching.

== See also ==
- Internet in the United Kingdom § History
- List of packet-switched networks
- Telecommunications in the United Kingdom
