= AUSTPAC =

Public X.25 network operated by Telstra

AUSTPAC was a public X.25 network operated by Telstra. Started by Telecom Australia in 1982, AUSTPAC was Australia's first public packet-switched data network, supporting applications such as online betting, financial applications (the Australian Taxation Office has made use of AUSTPAC) and remote terminal access to academic institutions, some of which maintained their connections to AUSTPAC up until the mid to late 1990s. Austpac could be accessed by dial-up to a PAD or by linking an X.25 node to the network permanently.

The Austpac general access telephone number was 01924 within Australia.

== Shutdown of Austpac ==
On 31 July 2006, Telstra announced the following timetable for the shutdown of Austpac:

From 31 July 31 2006, Austpac dedicated and dialup services via X.25, X.28, X.32 & X.75 would no longer be sold to new customers.

From 31 December 31 2007, Austpac dedicated and dialup services via X.25, X.28, X.32 & X.75 would no longer be sold to existing customers.

On 30 June 30 2008, the Austpac network was decommissioned and was no longer be available to customers.

Austpac continued to be provisioned to Argent and Digital Data Services (DDS) customers to access and manage their service, until further notice. Argent and DDS customers' service will not be terminated as a result of the withdrawal of Austpac.
