= Telenet =

American commercial packet-switched network

Telenet was an American commercial packet-switched network which went into service in August 16, 1975. It was the first FCC-licensed public data network in the United States. Various commercial and government interests paid monthly fees for dedicated lines connecting their computers and local networks to this backbone network. Free public dialup access to Telenet, for those who wished to access these systems, was provided in hundreds of cities throughout the United States.

== History ==
After establishing that commercial operation of "value added carriers" was legal in the U.S., Bolt Beranek and Newman (BBN), who were the private contractors for constructing packet switching nodes (Interface Message Processor) for the ARPANET, set out to create a private sector version. The original founding company, Telenet Inc., was established by BBN. In January 1975, Telenet Communications Corporation announced that they had acquired the necessary venture capital after a two-year quest. Initially, Bob Kahn was the first President of Telenet; he then moved to ARPA as Larry Roberts left to become President of the company. Barry Wessler also joined from ARPA. On August 16 of the same year they began operating the first public data network. (Note: The first experimental public packet switching networks, RETD in Spain and RCP in France were deployed in 1972. EPSS was under development in the United Kingdom.)

The network offered an email service called Telemail.

Telenet had its first offices in downtown Washington, D.C., then moved to McLean, Virginia. It was acquired by GTE in 1979, and then moved to offices in Reston, Virginia. It was later acquired by Sprint and called "Sprintnet". Sprint migrated customers from Telenet to the modern-day Sprintlink IP network, one of many networks composing today's Internet.

== Coverage ==
Originally, the public network had switching nodes in seven US cities:

- Washington, D.C. (network operations center as well as switching)
- Boston, Massachusetts
- New York, New York
- Chicago, Illinois
- Dallas, Texas
- San Francisco, California
- Los Angeles, California

The switching nodes were fed by Telenet Access Controller (TAC) terminal concentrators both colocated and remote from the switches. By 1980, there were over 1000 switches in the public network. At that time, the next largest network using Telenet switches was that of Southern Bell, which had approximately 250 switches.

In 1977, Telenet added a London node and a Network Control Centre in a London building of Britain's Post Office Telecommunications.

== Internal network technology ==
Telenet initially used a proprietary virtual connection host interface. The network used statically defined hop-by-hop routing, using Prime commercial minicomputers as switches, but then migrated to a purpose-built multiprocessing switch based on 6502 microprocessors. Among the innovations of this second-generation switch was a patented arbitrated bus interface that created a switched fabric among the microprocessors. By contrast, a typical microprocessor-based system of the time used a bus; switched fabrics did not become common until about twenty years later, with the advent of PCI Express and HyperTransport.

Most interswitch lines ran at 56 kbit/s, with a few, such as New York-Washington, at T1 (i.e., 1.544 Mbit/s).

Originally, the switching tables could not be altered separately from the main executable code, and topology updates had to be made by deliberately crashing the switch code and forcing a reboot from the network management center. Improvements in the software allowed new tables to be loaded, but the network never used dynamic routing protocols. Multiple static routes, on a switch-by-switch basis, could be defined for fault tolerance. Network management functions continued to run on Prime minicomputers.

Roberts and Barry Wessler joined the international effort to standardize the a protocol for packet-switched data communication based on virtual circuits shortly before it was finalized. The CCITT proposal for X.25 was being prepared by Rémi Després and other international experts. A few minor changes, which complemented the proposed specification, were accommodated to enable Telenet to join the agreement. Telenet adopted X.25 shortly after the protocol was published in March 1976. Its X.25 host interface was the first in the industry. (Note: DATAPAC in Canada was the first public data network specifically designed for X.25, which also entered service in 1976.)

The main internal protocol was a proprietary variant on X.75; Telenet also ran standard X.75 gateways to other packet switching networks.

== Accessing the network ==
=== Basic asynchronous access ===
Users could use modems on the Public Switched Telephone Network to dial TAC ports, calling either from "dumb" terminals or from computers emulating such terminals. Organizations with a large number of local terminals could install a TAC on their own site, which used a dedicated line, at up to 56 kbit/s, to connect to a switch at the nearest Telenet location. Dialup modems supported had a maximum speed of 1200 bit/s, and later 4800 bit/s.

For example, a customer in NYC could dial into the local number, then type in a command similar to:

c 301 555

which would connect (that "c") them to a computer system designated as number "555" located in the same vicinity as the standard telephone "area code" 301.

One significant customer was an early (what would now be called) internet service provider The Source which had their equipment in Mclean, Va. Telenet offered a much lower nighttime rate when there were few corporate customers, and this let The Source set up a modestly priced offering to tens of thousands of customers. Another prominent customer in the 1980s was Quantum Link (now AOL).

=== Other access protocols ===
Telenet supported remote concentrators for IBM 3270 family intelligent terminals, which communicated, via X.25 to Telenet-written software that ran in IBM 370x series front-end processors. Telenet also supported Block Mode Terminal Interfaces (BMTI) for IBM Remote Job Entry terminals supporting the 2780/3780 and HASP Bisync protocols.

=== PC Pursuit ===
In the late 1980s, Telenet offered a service called PC Pursuit. For a flat monthly fee, customers could dial into the Telenet network in one city, then dial out on the modems in another city to access bulletin board systems and other services. PC Pursuit was popular among computer hobbyists because it sidestepped long-distance charges. In this sense, PC Pursuit was similar to the Internet, allowing any user to call any system as if it were local.

On connection to the network, the user entered a 5-letter code for the target city they wished to call. This consisted of a 2-letter state code and a 3-letter acronym for the city. For instance, to call a system in Cleveland, Ohio, the user would enter the code OHCLV, for "OHio", "CLeVeland". Once connected, the user could dial out to any local number, and the system simulated a direct connection between the two endpoints.

Partial list of cities accessible by PC Pursuit
City Code	Area Code(s)	City
AZPHO	602	Phoenix, Arizona
CAGLE	818	Glendale, California
CALAN	213	Los Angeles, California
CODEN	303	Denver, Colorado
CTHAR	203	Hartford, Connecticut
FLMIA	305	Miami, Florida
GAATL	404	Atlanta, Georgia
ILCHI	312, 815	Chicago, Illinois
MABOS	617	Boston, Massachusetts
MIDET	313	Detroit, Michigan
MNMIN	612	Minneapolis, Minnesota
NCRTP	919	Research Triangle Park, North Carolina
NJNEW	201	Newark, New Jersey
NYNYO	212, 718	New York City
OHCLV	216	Cleveland, Ohio
ORPOR	503	Portland, Oregon
PAPIT	412	Pittsburgh, Pennsylvania
PAPHI	215	Philadelphia, Pennsylvania
TXDAL	214, 817	Dallas, Texas
TXHOU	713	Houston, Texas
WIMIL	414	Milwaukee, Wisconsin
WASEA	206	Seattle, Washington

== See also ==
- History of email
- International Packet Switched Service
- Timeline of the history of the Internet
- Tymnet
