= ConnNet =

US-based packet switched data network

ConnNet was a packet switched data network operated by the Southern New England Telephone Company serving the U.S. state of Connecticut.

ConnNet was the nation's first local public packet switching network when it was launched on March 11, 1985. Users could access services such as Dow Jones News Retrieval, CompuServe, Dialcom, GEnie, Delphi, Eaasy Sabre, NewsNet, PeopleLink, the National Library of Medicine, and BIX. ConnNet could also be used to access other national and international packet networks, such as Tymnet and ACCUNET. Large companies also connected their mainframe computers to ConnNet allowing employees access to the mainframes from home. The network is no longer in operation.

== Hardware ==
The X.25 network was based on hardware from Databit, Inc. consisting of three EDX-P Network Nodes that performed switching and were located in Hartford, New Haven and Stamford. Databit also supplied 23 ANP 2520 Advanced Network Processors each of which provided the system with a point of presence, a network control center and modems. Customers would order leased line connections into the network for host computers running at 4,800 to 56,000 bits per second (bit/s). Terminals would connect over a leased line from 1,200 to 9,600 bit/s synchronous, 300 to 2,400 bit/s asynchronous or using dial-up connections from 300 to 1,200 bit/s. The connection to Tymnet was established over an X.75 based 9,600 bit/s analog link from the ConnNet Hartford node to Tymnet's Bloomfield node.
