= Rémi Després =

- Born: January 16, 1943; Paris
- Citizenship: France
- Education: École polytechnique (France); UC Berkeley (California)
- Known for: RCP; Transpac; X.25; 6rd
- Scientific career
- Fields: Data networks Computer science

Rémi Després (born January 16, 1943) is a French engineer and entrepreneur known for his contributions on data networking.

== Education ==
In 1961–1963, Rémi Després attended École Polytechnique of Paris, of which he holds an Engineer degree.

At UC Berkeley, he received a master's degree in 1967, and a Ph.D degree in 1969, both in the EECS Department.

== Career ==
From 1963 to 1971 at CNET and UC Berkeley, he specialized in programming languages and time-sharing operating systems.

From 1971 to 1980, Rémi Després was in charge of R&D of the French PTT on packet switching. He was one of the leading "innovators who worked across the boundaries of computers and communications" in the 1970s. As such, he introduced the concept of "graceful saturated operation", which was referenced by Bob Kahn and Vint Cerf in their seminal 1974 paper on internetworking, "A Protocol for Packet Network Intercommunication". He formalized the concept of virtual circuits, (Note: Paul Baran introduced the concept of virtual circuits in 1962.) and validated it on the RCP experimental network with his team at CNET. He then successfully submitted for the X.25 Recommendation of CCITT, the standard of public data networks of the 1970s–1980s. He was the first Chief Technical Officer in charge of the French TRANSPAC network whose X.25 service has been operational from 1978 to 2011.

After working one year for Cap Gemini Sogeti, and four years for SESA, in 1985 Rémi Després founded the LAN and Frame-Relay-products enterprise RCE, a company acquired in 1996 by the CS Group. In 1998, he founded a second startup, StreamCore SA, specialised in quality of service management in TCP/IP, the Internet technology. When Streamcore SA was terminated in 2003, its StreamGroomer products were taken over by a new company, Streamcore Systems SA.

Since 2003, Rémi Després has been working as an independent researcher and consultant, mainly contributing to IETF to facilitate deployment of IPv6, the protocol that had become necessary to extend the number of customer addresses of the Internet. In particular, he invented and promoted 6rd, a mechanism whereby Free, an Internet service provider, deployed IPv6 service several years before similar network operators, and in only five weeks. Another notable contribution concerned 4rd, a technology to maintain a residual IPv4 service across IPv6-only networks. He also proposed a mechanism for Internet service providers to assign IPv6 addresses into customer sites that still have IPv4-only residential gateways, with the distinctive feature that IPv6 traffic between devices of a same site remains within this site. In 2011, Rémi Després and Alexandre Cassen received the Itojun Service Award of the Internet Society for their IPv6 work.

== See also ==
- History of the Internet
- Internet in France
- Louis Pouzin
- Protocol Wars
