= Telenet (disambiguation) =

Telenet is a former US particular packet switched network which went into service in 1975.

Telenet may also refer to:

- Telenet Group, a Belgian telecommunications company
- Telenet Japan, a Japanese video game and software developer

== See also ==
- Telnet, a network protocol used on the Internet
