= DATAPAC =

Early computer data packet switching network

DATAPAC, or Datapac in some documents, was Canada's packet switched X.25-equivalent data network. Initial work on a data-only network started in 1972 and was announced by Bell Canada in 1974 as Dataroute. DATAPAC was implemented by adding packet switching to the existing Dataroute networks. It opened for use in 1976 as the world's first public data network designed specifically for X.25. (Note: Telenet opened in 1975, based on proprietary protocols, and converted to X.25 in 1976. Experimental public packet switching networks were in operation in Europe in the early 1970s, including RETD in Spain and RCP in France. EPSS was under development in the United Kingdom.)

Operated first by Trans-Canada Telephone System, then Telecom Canada, then the Stentor Alliance, it finally reverted to Bell Canada when the Stentor Alliance was dissolved in 1999. Like most X.25 networks in the western world, DATAPAC services were largely replaced by TCP/IP in the 1990s and 2000s. Bell phased out the service on 31 December 2009.

== History ==
Bell Canada had long offered leased lines to large business customers like banks and insurance companies who needed to move data between their offices. The company offered only the physical link, it was up to the customers to provide the equipment needed to link their systems together, typically provided by their primary mainframe vendors. Such a set-up was not inexpensive to install or operate.

In the early 1970s, Bell began exploring ways to make this service more attractive to smaller companies and offices. This led to Dataroute, carried on the coast-to-coast Trans Canada Microwave network. In contrast to earlier leased lines, Dataroute allowed multiple customers to share a single channel, folded together using time division multiplexing, and then sent across the country on the existing high-speed microwave links. Customers could also save money if they only needed lower data speeds or to exchange data at certain times of the day. On its commercial release in February 1973, it was given the name The Dataroute.

Through this period, the first experimental packet switching networks were being installed. These offered the ability to greatly increase the number of customers able to use the network. In time division multiplexing, each customer is given a fixed time slot, which is used up even if they do not transmit anything during that period. In contrast, packet switching gathers data from many interfaces and then sends them as continually as possible. This means unused time by any given customer can be used to send packets from another. In systems where the total utilization is low or peaky, this can allow many customers to use a single link. The new system was announced in March 1976.

Bell was among many telecommunications companies examining packet switching, and there was a desire to allow data on any one of the PTTs networks to seamlessly transit to another, allowing computers to be connected across national boundaries. In 1975, these efforts were formalized under the international X.25 project, which released their standards in a series of books starting in 1976 with the "Orange Book". Bell's network was already well developed by this point and changes had to be made in order to conform to the initial standard, known as SNAP.

Having already set up many of the underlying systems needed to support X.25, DATAPAC was able to open shortly after the publication of the SNAP standard. The traffic was routed in the SL-10 switch, designed by Bell Northern Research and built by Northern Telecom. The initial network had SL-10 nodes in Calgary, Toronto, Ottawa and Montreal, linked together using Dataroute's existing 56k microwave links. A network operations center was set up in Ottawa, linked into the network on 9600 bps links directly to the Ottawa and Toronto nodes. By 1980, the network was available in fourteen major cities, and by the mid-80s, local dialup numbers were available in most cities and larger towns.

In its initial installations, customer sites would connect to the network using a SNAP interface, or through the simplified "Interactive Terminal Interface" which emulated a modem connection. Users could pay more to have their traffic prioritized. For normal users, the average packet trip time was 0.36 seconds and for priority users, 0.13 seconds.

With the advent of lower-cost WAN technologies like IP/MPLS, the importance of DATAPAC diminished in the marketplace. Bell phased out support for DATAPAC, discontinuing the service at the end of 2009.

== Use ==
One of the uses of DATAPAC network was to transmit debit card transactions between retailers and the financial institutions (banks) through the Interac Direct Payment EFTPOS network. Some automatic teller machines also used the DATAPAC network.

It was also used to transmit lottery ticket numbers that are purchased by customers.

== Types of connections ==
DATAPAC 3101
Teletype (ASCII) connections, both dial and leased.
DATAPAC 3201
Connections were made by using leased line connections in a speciality financial industry code.
DATAPAC 3000
X.25 connections

== See also ==
- Internet in Canada
- Telenet
- Tymnet
