= Public data network =

Data services for the public

A public data network (PDN) is a network established and operated by a telecommunications administration, or a recognized private operating agency, for the specific purpose of providing data transmission services for the public.

The first public packet switching networks were RETD in Spain (1972), the experimental RCP network in France (1972) and Telenet in the United States (1975). "Public data network" was the common name given to the collection of X.25 providers, the first of which were Telenet in the U.S. and DATAPAC in Canada (both in 1976), and Transpac in France (in 1978). The International Packet Switched Service (IPSS) was the first commercial and international packet-switched network (1978). The networks were interconnected with gateways using X.75. These combined networks had large global coverage during the 1980s and into the 1990s. The networks later provided the infrastructure for the early Internet.

== Description ==
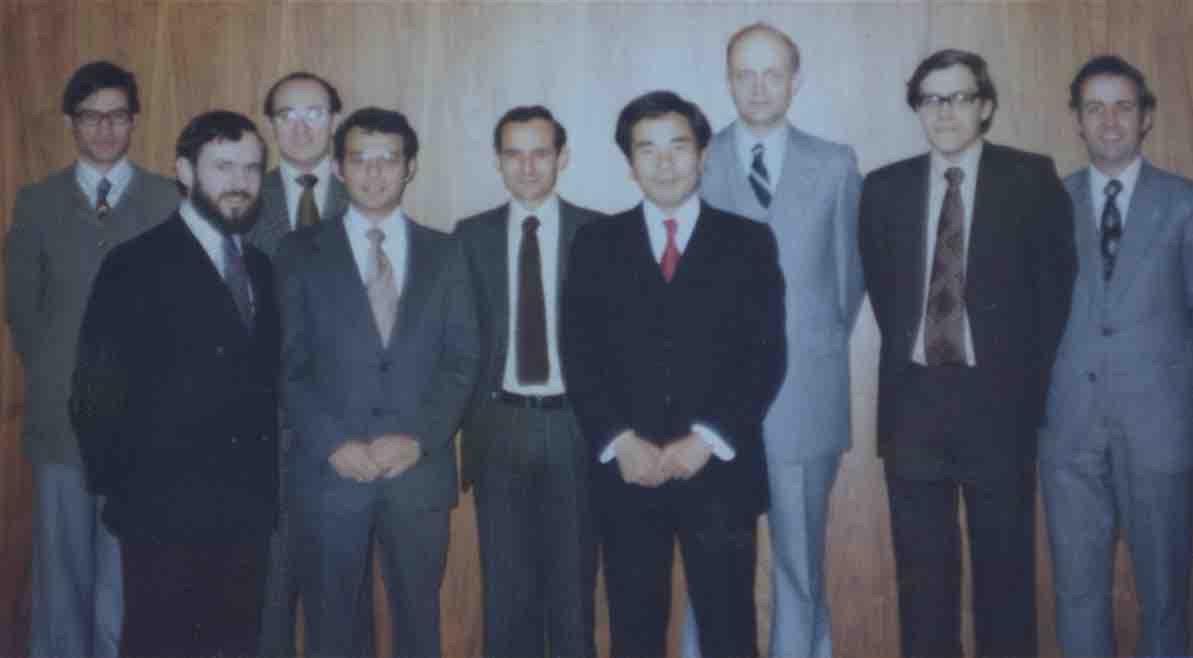
Representatives of PTTs and private companies who championed the development of X.25-based networks and services in Europe, North America and Japan.

In communications, a PDN is a circuit- or packet-switched network that is available to the public and that can transmit data in digital form. A PDN provider is a company that provides access to a PDN and that provides any of X.25, Frame Relay, or cell relay (ATM) services. Access to a PDN generally includes a guaranteed bandwidth, known as the committed information rate (CIR). Costs for the access depend on the guaranteed rate. PDN providers differ in how they charge for temporary increases in required bandwidth (known as surges). Some use the amount of overrun; others use the surge duration.

=== Public switched data network ===
A public switched data network (PSDN) is a network for providing data services via a system of multiple wide area networks, similar in concept to the public switched telephone network (PSTN). A PSDN may use a variety of switching technologies, including packet switching, circuit switching, and message switching. A packet-switched PSDN may also be called a packet-switched data network.

Originally the term PSDN referred only to Packet Switch Stream (PSS), an X.25-based packet-switched network in the United Kingdom, mostly used to provide leased-line connections between local area networks and the Internet using permanent virtual circuits (PVCs). Today, the term may refer not only to Frame Relay and Asynchronous Transfer Mode (ATM), both providing PVCs, but also to Internet Protocol (IP), GPRS, and other packet-switching techniques.

Whilst there are several technologies that are superficially similar to the PSDN, such as Integrated Services Digital Network (ISDN) and the digital subscriber line (DSL) technologies, they are not examples of it. ISDN utilizes the PSTN circuit-switched network, and DSL uses point-to-point circuit switching communications overlaid on the PSTN local loop (copper wires), usually utilized for access to a packet-switched broadband IP network.

=== Public data transmission service ===
A public data transmission service is a data transmission service that is established and operated by a telecommunication administration, or a recognized private operating agency, and uses a public data network. A public data transmission service may include Circuit Switched Data, packet-switched, and leased line data transmission.

== History ==
Public packet switching networks came into operation in the 1970s. The first were RETD in Spain, in 1972; the experimental RCP in France, also in 1972; Telenet in the United States, which began operation with proprietary protocols in 1975; EIN in the EEC in 1976; and EPSS in the United Kingdom in 1976 (in development since 1969).

Telenet adopted X.25 protocols shortly after they were published in 1976 while DATAPAC in Canada was the first public data network specifically designed for X.25, also in 1976. Many other PDNs adopted X.25 when they came into operation, including Transpac in France in 1978, Euronet in the EEC in 1979, Packet Switch Stream in the United Kingdom in 1980, and AUSTPAC in Australia in 1982. Iberpac in Spain adopted X.25 in the 1980s. Tymnet and CompuServe in the United States also adopted X.25.

The International Packet Switched Service (IPSS) was the first commercial and international packet-switched network. It was a collaboration between British and American telecom companies that became operational in 1978.

The SITA Data Transport Network for airlines adopted X.25 in 1981, becoming the world's most extensive packet-switching network.

The networks were interconnected with gateways using X.75. These combined networks had large global coverage during the 1980s and into the 1990s.

The first public dial-in networks used asynchronous teleprinter (TTY) terminal protocols to reach a concentrator operated in the public network. Some networks, such as Telenet and CompuServe, used X.25 to multiplex the terminal sessions into their packet-switched backbones, while others, such as Tymnet, used proprietary protocols.

Over time, other packet-switching technologies, including Frame Relay (FR) and Asynchronous Transfer Mode (ATM) gradually replaced X.25.

Many of these networks later adopted TCP/IP and provided the infrastructure for the early Internet.

== See also ==
- History of the Internet
- International Network Working Group
- National research and education network
- Protocol Wars
- OSI model
- X.25 § History

== Sources ==
- Schatt, Stan (1991). Linking LANs: A Micro Manager's Guide. McGraw-Hill. ISBN 0-8306-3755-9.
