= X.32 =

X.32 is an old ITU-T standard published in 1984 for connecting to an X.25 network by dial-up. It defines how the network identifies the terminal for billing and security purposes.
