= Iberpac =

Iberpac (or Red UNO) was the Spanish packet switched X.25 public data network. It was operated by Telefónica España, the incumbent Spanish telecommunications operator. Iberpac lents its name to Iberpac Plus and Iberpac Básico, the latest X.25 services in Spain.

== History ==
=== Red Especial de Transmisión de Datos ===
Iberpac evolved from the Spanish Red Especial de Transmisión de Datos (RETD), the world's first public data network. Created in 1971, RETD was based on general-purpose Univac 418 III computers. The original Red Secundaria de Alto Nivel (RSAN) protocols for RETD were custom-developed by Telefónica (then CTNE) under ARPANET design principles.

=== Project TESYS ===
By 1978, project TESYS (Telefónica, SECOINSA, SITRE) started the development of specific-purpose switching nodes. Some of the design principles of TESYS nodes were advanced for their time (multithreading, token passing protocols). In contrast, the large user base with terminals based on legacy RSAN protocols slowed the adoption of X.25, TESYS product development and support were targeted to CTNE only (thus precluding the spread of TESYS to international markets) and data lines in Spain became slow for their time (only 2% lines above 1200 bit/s in Spain in 1982, compare 89% in West Germany).

=== Iberpac and Red UNO X.25 ===
Renamed as IBERPAC, the network evolved to X.25 in the 1980s, and it was renamed again as 'Red UNO' in the 1990s. Bank branches and financial services conformed the main user base. IBERPAC enabled new videotex and teletext services, although the adoption lagged far behind the popularity of similar services in other countries, such as the French Minitel. Services based on legacy RSAN protocols were definitely scrapped in 1996.

== Use ==
Until December 31, 2015, Red UNO supported two legacy X.25 services: flat-rate Iberpac Plus and pay-per-use Iberpac Básico. Iberpac services were targeted to corporate customers with specific reliability demands.
