= Tymnet =

Defunct international data communications network

Tymnet was an international data communications network developed and operated by Tymshare. It was situated at and maintained by the company’s headquarters in Cupertino, California. The Tymnet network used packet-switching techniques including statistical multiplexing, and connected host computers at companies, educational institutions, and government agencies through the use of synchronous leased lines and programmable terminal interfaces.

The business consisted of a large public network that supported dial-up users and a private network that allowed government agencies and large companies (mostly banks and airlines) to build their own dedicated networks. The private networks were often connected via gateways to the public network to reach locations not on the private network. Tymnet was also connected to dozens of international public gateways via Tymnet II protocol and other public networks in the United States and internationally via X.25/X.75 gateways.

As the Internet grew and became almost universally accessible in the late 1990s, the need for services such as Tymnet migrated to the Internet style connections, but still had some value in the Third World and for specific legacy roles. However the value of these links continued to decrease, and Tymnet shut down in 2004.

== Network ==
Tymnet offered local dial-up modem access in most cities in the United States and to a limited degree in Canada, which preferred its own DATAPAC service.

Users would dial into Tymnet and then interact with a simple command-line interface to establish a connection with a remote system. Once connected, data was passed to and from the user as if connected directly to a modem on the distant system.

Tymnet was extensively used by large companies to provide dial-up services for their employees who were "on the road", as well as a gateway for users to connect to large online services such as CompuServe or The Source.

=== Organization and functionality ===
In its original implementation, the network supervisor contained most of the routing intelligence in the network. Unlike the TCP/IP protocol underlying the internet, Tymnet used a circuit switching layout which allowed the supervisors to be aware of every possible end-point. In its original incarnation, the users connected to nodes built using Varian minicomputers, then entered commands that were passed to the supervisor which ran on a XDS 940 host.

Circuits were character oriented and the network was oriented towards interactive character-by-character full-duplex communications circuits. The nodes handled character translation between various character sets, which were numerous at that time. This did have the side effect of making data transfers quite difficult, as bytes from the file would be invisibly "translated" without specific intervention on the part of the user.

Tymnet later developed their own custom hardware, the Tymnet Engine, which contained both nodes and a supervisor running on one of those nodes. As the network grew, the supervisor was in danger of being overloaded by the sheer number of nodes in the network, since the requirements for controlling the network took a great part of the supervisor's capacity.

Tymnet II was developed in response to this challenge. Tymnet II was developed to ameliorate the problems outlined above by off-loading some of the work-load from the supervisor and providing greater flexibility in the network by putting more intelligence into the node code. A Tymnet II node would set up its own "permuter tables", eliminating the need for the supervisor to keep copies of them, and had greater flexibility in handling its inter-node links. Data transfers were also possible via "auxiliary circuits".

== History ==
=== Beginnings: Tymnet ===
Tymshare was founded in 1964 as a time sharing company, selling computer time and software packages for users. It had two SDS/XDS 940 computers; access was via direct dial-up to the computers. In 1968, it purchased Dial Data, another time-sharing service bureau.

In 1968, Norm Hardy and LaRoy Tymes developed the idea of using remote sites with minicomputers to communicate with the mainframes. The minicomputers would serve as the network's nodes, running a program to route data. In November 1971, the first Tymnet Supervisor program became operational. Written in assembly code by LaRoy Tymes for the SDS 940, with architectural design contributions from Norman Hardy, the "Supervisor" was the beginning of the Tymnet network. One instance of the supervisor would be running at all times and choose a path (circuit) through the network for each new interactive session. The Varian 620i (8K of 16 bit words) was used for the TYMNET nodes. Initially, Tymshare and its direct customers were the network's only users. In February, 1972, the National Library of Medicine became the first non-Tymshare network customer with a toxicology data base on an IBM 360.

It soon became apparent that the SDS 940 could not keep up with the rapid growth of the network. In 1972, Joseph Rinde joined the Tymnet group and began porting the Supervisor code to the 32-bit Interdata 7/32, as the 8/32 was not yet ready. In 1973, the 8/32 became available, but the performance was disappointing and a crash-effort was made to develop a machine that could run Rinde's Supervisor.

In 1974, a second, more efficient version of the Supervisor software became operational. The new Tymnet "Engine" software was used on both the Supervisor machines and on the nodes. After the migration to the Tymnet Engine, they started developing Tymnet accounting and other support software on the PDP-10. Tymshare sold the Tymnet network software to TRW, who created their own private network, TRWNET.

Tymes and Rinde then developed "Tymnet II". Tymnet II ran in parallel with the original network, which continued to run on the Varian machines until it was phased out over a period of several years. Tymnet II's different method of constructing virtual circuits allowed for much better scalability.

In 1996, the third and final version of the Supervisor was written in C for a Sparc multiprocessor work station by Tymes and Romolo Raffo. Node code software was ported from the Tymnet Engine to a Sparc platform by Bill Soley. Up to 10 old-style Tymnet Engines were replaced by a single Sparc node in the network switching centers.

=== Tymnet, Inc. spun off ===
In about 1979, Tymnet Inc. was spun off from Tymshare Inc. to continue administration and operation of the Tymnet network and its VAN services. The network continued to grow, and customers who owned their own host computers and wanted access to them from remote sites became interested in connecting their computers to the network. This led to the foundation of Tymnet as a wholly owned subsidiary of Tymshare to run a public network as a common carrier within the United States. This allowed users to connect their host computers and terminals to the network, and use the computers from remote sites or sell time on their computers to other users of the network, with Tymnet charging them for the use of the network.

The network offered an email service called OnTyme.

=== Sold to McDonnell Douglas ===
McDonnell Douglas Tymshare

In 1984 Tymnet was bought by the McDonnell Douglas Corporation as part of the acquisition of Tymshare. The company was renamed McDonnell Douglas Tymshare, and began a major reorganization. A year later, McDonnell Douglas (MD) split Tymshare into several separate operating companies: MD Network Systems Company, MD Field Service Company, MD RCS, MD "xxx" and many more. (This is sometimes referred to the Alphabet Soup phase of the company). At this point, Tymnet had outlived its parent company Tymshare.

McDonnell Douglas acquired Microdata and created MD Information Systems Group (MDISC), expecting to turn Microdata's desktop and server systems along with Tymshare's servers and Tymnet data network into a major player in the Information Services market. Microdata's systems were integrated into many parts of McDonnell Douglas, but Tymnet never was. MDC really did not seem to understand the telecommunications market. After five years, peace was breaking out in many places in the world and McDonnell Douglas sold off MDNSC and MDFSC at a profit for much needed cash.

Earlier, in 1986, the Canadian Radio-television and Telecommunications Commission (CRTC) liberalized the interconnection rules in the provinces it then regulated (Ontario, Quebec and British Columbia) and this allowed McDonnell Douglas to expand the network into select Canadian cities. The Canadian operation was part of McDonnell Douglas Computer Systems Company (MDCSC) as this was the only MDxxx company operating in Canada. MDCSC hired David Kingsland to spearhead this expansion into Canada.

=== Sold to British Telecom ===
==== BT Tymnet, BT North America, BTNA ====
On July 30, 1989, at the Marriott Hotel in Santa Clara, it was announced that British Telecom was purchasing McDonnell Douglas Network Systems Company, and McDonnell Douglas Field Service Company was being spun off as a start-up called NovaDyne. British Telecom (BT) wanted to expand and the acquisition of Tymnet, which already a worldwide data network, was projected to help to achieve that goal. On November 17, 1989, MDNSC officially became BT Tymnet with its parochial U.S. headquarters in San Jose, California. BT brought with it the idea of continuous development with teams in America, Europe, and Asia-pacific all working together on the same projects. BT renamed the Tymnet services, Global Network Services (GNS).

British Telecom brought new life to the company with development of hardware and software for the Tymnet data network using contacts BT already had with telecommunication hardware vendors. There was a trial of "next-generation" nodes scattered throughout the network, called "TURBO engine nodes" based on the Motorola 68000 family. In the mid to late 1980s, serious node-code development was migrated from the PDP-10s to UNIX. Sun-3 (based on the Motorola 68000) and later Sun-4 (SPARC based) workstations and servers were purchased from Sun Microsystems, though the majority of PDP-10s were still around in the early '90s for legacy code, as well as documentation storage. Eventually, all of the code development trees were on the Sun-4s, and the development tools (NAD, etc.) had been ported to SunOS.

Another project begun a few months before the BT purchase was to migrate the Tymnet code repository from the PDP-10s to Sun systems. The new servers were dubbed the Code Generation Systems or CGS. They were initially six Sun-3 servers upgraded eventually to two Sun-4/690 servers for redundancy. A second pair of servers for catastrophic failover were also installed in Malvern, PA and later moved to Norristown, PA as part of later site consolidation efforts. After the migration, there was code for more than 6000 nodes and 38,000 customer interfaces.

Tymnet was still growing, and at several times reached its peak capacity when some of its customers held network intensive events. One of these of note was a live, on-line presentation and chat on America On-Line (AOL) with Michael Jackson. Tymnet usage statistics showed AOL's call capacity was greater than its maximum volume for the duration of the event.

=== Sold to MCI, Concert ===
==== MCI, NewCo, Concert ====
In 1993 British Telecom (BT) and MCI Communications (MCI) negotiated what they called the "Deal of the Century", where MCI would take ownership of the US-based portions of Tymnet and they would create a 50/50 joint venture called "Concert". (The joint venture was called "NewCo" for more than a year while they decided on a name.) Concert was also aligned with another acquisition of BT, called Syncordia which was headquartered in Atlanta, Ga. Tymnet was then referred to as: The Packet network, the BT/MCI network and Concert Packet-switching Services (CPS). As MCI cut away at Tymnet, expecting it to die, it became a cash cow that just wouldn't go away.

In May 1994, there were still three DEC KL-10s under TYMCOM-X. At this time, the network had approximately 5000 nodes in 30 foreign countries. A variety of protocols can be run over a single packet-switching network, and Tymnet's most-used protocols were X.25, asynchronous (ATI/AHI), SNA.

BT and Concert also continued to develop the network, and after the failure of the "Turbo nodes" to take off, decided to have an outside company add Tymnet protocols to existing hardware used in their frame-relay network. Telematics International developed a subset of the Tymnet protocols to run on their ACP/PCP nodes. The Telematics nodes were connected in a mesh network via Frame Relay and appeared to Tymnet as super-nodes that were directly connected to as many as 44 other super-nodes interconnecting most of Europe, Asia and the Americas as a high-speed-data network.

MCI took a different direction and looked to migrate the network protocols to run over TCP/IP and use Sun Microsystems SPARC technology. The supervisor technology was rewritten in C to run as standard UNIX applications under Sun's Solaris operating system. Funding for this project was at a minimum but the Tymnet engineers believed it was a superior method and proceeded anyway.

Times were changing and the Internet and World Wide Web were becoming a practical and even important part of corporate and personal life. Tymnet technology needed improvements to keep pace with TCP/IP and other internet protocols. Both BT and MCI decided not to compete with the Internet, but to convert their customer base to IP based networks and technologies. However, the Tymnet network was still bringing in much cash (in some cases more than current IP-based services), so both BT and MCI needed to keep their customers happy.

==== MCI, MCI Worldcom, Worldcom vs. BT, Concert, AT&T ====
In 1997 talks were underway for British Telecom (BT) to acquire MCI. The deal fell through, and in September, 1998 MCI was acquired by WorldCom after they made a better offer for the company. Actually, the Worldcom offer was nearly identical to the BT offer, but where BT planned to buy out MCI shares of stock, WorldCom offered a stock-swap which was more attractive to the stockholders. Worldcom took control in September 1998 and dissolved the BT/MCI alliance as of October 15, 1998.

==== Concert - headquarters in Reston, Va. ====
With the alliance gone, BT and MCI/Worldcom began the process of unraveling and separating their extensive voice and data communications systems.

Concert created Project Leonardo to separate the BT and MCI/Worldcom voice and data networks. At times over the next five years, advancements were made or stalled due to BT and MCI management negotiating and renegotiating the terms of their contractual obligations to each other made during the alliance. At times, things came to a standstill, or decisions made were reversed, and some reversed again at a later time. Parts of the project were to migrate customers from X.25 to IP based networks, while others created a duplicate set of services so that both Concert and MCI could separately continue to run and manage their own portions of the network. Accounting data for network usage was also shared by the two companies and had to be separated before clients could be billed properly.

==== Concert - headquarters in Atlanta, Ga. ====
In 2000 BT then went searching for another alliance, and created a new "Concert" alliance between BT and AT&T Corporation, moving the headquarters to Atlanta, Georgia. This alliance did not help the negotiations between BT and MCI Worldcom as their partners from MCI and AT&T were corporate enemies. For Tymnet, the data network portion of the split, and the "CPS Leonardo" project, the split was never fully realized. Instead, MCI Worldcom completed their migration of services from Tymnet to IP based services in March 2003 and disconnected their supervisor nodes and their portion of the network on March 31, 2003. British Telecom continued to run the network using their own supervisor and other utility nodes until February 2004 when their last customer was able to move all of its customers to other access services. BT and AT&T dissolved their Concert alliance on September 30, 2003, and the remaining BT assets were combined with BTNA assets into BT Americas, Inc. Sometime in early March 2004, without ceremony, BT Americas disconnected the last two remaining Tymnet supervisors from the network, effectively shutting it down.

==== Worldcom bankruptcy ====
Worldcom executives were involved in a financial scandal. In June 2002, Worldcom admitted to nearly 4 billion dollars of incorrect accounting. The scandal resulted in the CEO, Bernard Ebbers, being ousted and later brought up on federal charges for conspiracy and securities fraud. The scandal sent the stock price down to ten cents per share. A month after the revelation of accounting "mishaps", Worldcom filed for bankruptcy.

==== MCI name revived and sold to Verizon ====
Worldcom came out of bankruptcy renamed as "MCI" in April 2004. In less than a year, the remains of MCI was sold for $6.7B bid to what is today known as Verizon Business, a division of Verizon. Verizon had been formed in 2000 when Bell Atlantic, one of the Regional Bell Operating Companies, merged with GTE. Prior to its transformation into Verizon, Bell Atlantic had merged with another Regional Bell Operating Company, NYNEX, in 1997.

==== AT&T sold to SBC ====
On January 31, 2005, SBC Communications announced that it would purchase AT&T Corp. for more than $16 billion. Shortly thereafter the name was changed to AT&T Inc. to distinguish itself from AT&T Corp.

== Electronic Data Interchange (EDI & EDI*Net) ==
Tymshare EDI, MD Payment Systems Company, BTNA/MCI EDI*Net Services

Tymshare was one of the pioneers in the EDI field. Under McDonnell Douglas, the Payment Systems Company continued that legacy and maintained its own EDI*Net network monitoring and support group.

EDI*Net used a fault-tolerant Tandem NonStop computer with a second synchronized remote disaster NonStop computer over 100 miles apart. Mirrors of each other, and maintaining uptimes over 99.994%, they were each connected to a high speed data links using Tymnet as the connection and translation medium. Tymshare developed a bi-sync modem interface (HSA), a translation module to translate between EBCDIC and ASCII (BBXS), and a highly customized X.25 module (XCOM). EDI*Net used these interfaces on the Tandems. EDI*Net supported & contributed to many EDI standards, with the United Nations' EDIFACT and ANSI X12 dominating. As a store-and-forward service, EDI*Net supported multiple delivery protocols besides X.25 and BiSync, including FTPS, SMTPS and ZModem, and allowed the enveloping structure of supported EDI standards to extend into X.400 and SMTP envelopes.

Developed to utilize X.25 (XCOM) and BiSync (BSC), there was no TCP/IP equivalent service within Tymnet. To continue use of this service after the shutdown of Tymnet, a solution was selected. A special version of Tymnet Engine node code which allows nodes and interfaces to communicate with one another and the rest of the network was created. Instead of relying on the "supervisor" to validate calls, a table of permitted connections was defined per customer to allow an incoming call to be made from the HSA interface to the BBXS interface to the XCOM interface and on to the Tandem computer. In effect, a "Tymnet Island" consisting of a single Tymnet node that accepted calls for a pre-determined list of clients was utilized by EDI*Net. No supervisor needed.

These islands of Tymnet have not only outlived the parent company, Tymshare, and the operations company, Tymnet, but also the Tymnet Network itself. As of 2008, these Tymnet Island nodes are still running and doing their jobs.

== Operations ==
=== Organization ===
In operation, Tymshare's Data Networks Division was responsible for the development and maintenance of the network and Tymnet was responsible for the administration, provisioning and monitoring of the network. Each company had their own software development staff and a line was drawn to separate what each group could do. Tymshare development engineers wrote all the code which ran in the network, and the Tymnet staff wrote code running on host computers connected to the network. It is for this reason, that many of the Tymnet projects ran on the Digital Equipment Corporation DECSystem-10 computers that Tymshare offered as timesharing hosts for their customers. Tymnet operations formed a strategic alliance with the Tymshare PDP-10 TYMCOM-X operating systems group to assist them in developing new network management tools.

=== Trouble tracking ===
==== Origins ====
From its earliest days, Tymnet had an on-line and real time network trouble reporting tool called the Consolidator. That, along with the network node interrogation capabilities (known as Snap or Snapshot), provided unique and real time operation of the network. However, trouble reports were initially tracked on a traditional paper ticket system. This was until Bill Scheible, a manager at Tymnet, wrote a small FORTRAN IV program to maintain a list of problem reports and track their status in a System 1022 database (a hierarchical database system for TOPS-10 published by Software House). The program was called PAPER after the old manual way of managing trouble tickets. The program grew as features were added to handle customer information, call-back contact information, escalation procedures, and outage statistics.

==== Company-wide use ====
Access to PAPER became critical as more and more functionality was added. It eventually was maintained on two dedicated PDP-10 computers, model KL-1090, accessible via the Tymnet Packet Network as Tymshare hosts 23 and 26. Each computer was the size of 5 refrigerators, and had a string of disks that looked like 18 washing machines. Their power supplies produced +5 volts at 200 amps (non-switching) making them expensive to operate.

==== Major upgrades ====
In 1996 the DEC PDP-10s that ran Tymnet's trouble-ticket system were replaced by PDP-10 clones from XKL, Inc. They were accessible via TCP/IP as ticket.tymnet.com and token.tymnet.com, by both TELNET and HTTP. A low-end workstation from Sun was used as a telnet gateway; it accepted logins from the Tymnet network via x.25 to IP translation done by a Cisco router forwarded to "ticket" and/or "token". The XKL TOAD-1 systems ran a modified TOPS-20. The application was ported to a newer version of the Fortran compiler, and still used the 1022 database.

==== Decommission ====
In mid to late 1998, Concert produced an inter-company trouble tracking system for use by both MCI and Concert. This was adopted and the TTS PAPER data necessary for ongoing tickets was re-entered on the new system. TTS was kept up for historical information until the end of the year.

In January 1999, both XKL servers (ticket and token) were decommissioned. In late 2003 the hardware left onsite in San Jose was accidentally scrapped by the facilities manager during a scheduled cleanup.

=== System 1022 (Database System) ===
System-1022 was a database that ran on Digital Equipment Corporation's 36-bit hardware: the DECsystem-10 and also the DECSYSTEM-20, hence the 1022 name.

1022 was a hierarchical database system which could be accessed via third-generation languages such as Fortran and COBOL; it also had its own 4GL.

==== Software House ====
Software House, the company that trademarked and brought 1022 to market also marketed a VAX counterpart, System-1032.

Software House was acquired by Computer Corporation of America.

==== System 1032 ====
In 1983, Software House released System 1032 for Digital Equipment Corporation's 32-bit VAX systems. Version 1.5 (1984) added EBCDIC support.

System 1032 was acquired by Computer Corporation of America (CCA) in 1992. In 2010, Rocket Software acquired CCA's products, including System 1032. Rocket continue to develop and maintain System 1032 for the OpenVMS operating system.

Like 1022, it had a Host Language Interface (HLI).

== See also ==
- ConnNet
- DATAPAC
- International Packet Switched Service
- Telenet
