= Roger Scantlebury =

British computer scientist and Internet pioneer (born 1936)

Roger Anthony Scantlebury (born August 1936) is a British computer scientist and Internet pioneer who worked at the National Physical Laboratory (NPL) and later at Logica.

Scantlebury led the pioneering work to implement packet switching and associated communication protocols at the NPL in the late 1960s. He proposed the use of the technology in the ARPANET, the forerunner of the Internet, at the inaugural Symposium on Operating Systems Principles in 1967. During the 1970s, he was a major figure in the International Network Working Group through which he was an early contributor to concepts used in the Transmission Control Program which became part of the Internet protocol suite.

== Early life ==
Roger Scantlebury was born in Ealing in 1936.

== Career ==
=== National Physical Laboratory ===
Scantlebury worked at the National Physical Laboratory in south-west London, in collaboration with the National Research Development Corporation (NRDC). His early work was on the Automatic Computing Engine and English Electric DEUCE computers.

Following this he was tasked by Derek Barber to lead the implementation of Donald Davies' pioneering packet switching concepts for data communication. Scantlebury and Keith Bartlett were the first to describe the term protocol in a modern data-communications context in an April 1967 memorandum entitled A Protocol for Use in the NPL Data Communications Network. In October 1967, he attended the Symposium on Operating Systems Principles in the United States, where he gave an exposition of packet-switching, developed at NPL (and referenced the work of Paul Baran). Also attending the conference was Larry Roberts, from the ARPA; this was the first time that Larry Roberts had heard of packet switching. Scantlebury persuaded Roberts and other American engineers to incorporate the concept into the design for the ARPANET.

Subsequently he led the development of the NPL Data Communications Network, publishing several research papers pioneering the development of packet-switched computer networks. Elements of the network became operational in early 1969, the first implementation of packet switching, and the NPL network was the first to use high-speed links. He was seconded to the Post Office Telecommunications in 1969, participating in a data communications study and supervising four data communications-related research contracts. This research team developed the alternating bit protocol (ABP).

Along with Davies and Barber, he was a major figure in the International Network Working Group (INWG) from 1972, initially chaired by Vint Cerf. He attended the INWG meeting in New York in June 1973 that shaped the early direction of international network protocols, and was acknowledged by Bob Kahn and Vint Cerf in their seminal 1974 paper on internetworking, A Protocol for Packet Network Intercommunication. He co-authored the standard agreed by INWG in 1975, Proposal for an international end to end protocol.

Scantlebury later reported directly to Davies at the NPL. As head of the data networks group within the Computer Science Division, he was responsible for the UK technical contribution to the European Informatics Network, a datagram network linking CERN, the French research centre INRIA and the UK’s National Physical Laboratory.

=== Later career ===
Scantlebury joined Logica in 1977 in their Communications Division, where he worked on the CCITT (ITU-T) X.25 protocol and with the formation of the Euronet, a pan-European virtual circuit network using X.25. He moved to the Finance Division in 1981.

In the 2000s, he worked for Mercator Software, Integra SP and as a consultant. Subsequently, he worked for Kofax (now Tungsten Automation) and retired in 2020.

== Personal life ==
Scantlebury married Christine Appleby in 1958 in Middlesex; they had two sons in 1961 and 1966, and a daughter in 1963. He lived in Esher.

He was influential in persuading NPL to sponsor a gallery about "Technology of the Internet" at The National Museum of Computing, which opened in 2009.

== Publications ==
- Davies, D. W.; Bartlett, K. A.; Scantlebury, R. A.; Wilkinson, P. T. (October 1967). A digital communications network for computers giving rapid response at remote terminals. ACM Symposium on Operating Systems Principles.
- Wilkinson, P.T.; Scantlebury, R.A. (1968). The control functions in a local data network. IFIP Congress (2) 1968: 734-738.
- Scantlebury, R. A.; Wilkinson, P.T.; Bartlett, K.A. (1968). The design of a message switching centre for a digital communication network. IFIP Congress (2) 1968: 723-727.
- Scantlebury, R. A. (1969). A model for the local area of a data communication network objectives and hardware organization. Symposium on Problems in the Optimization of Data Communications Systems 1969: 183-204
- Bartlett, Keith A.; Scantlebury, Roger A.; Wilkinson, Peter T. (1969). A note on reliable full-duplex transmission over half-duplex links. Commun. ACM 12(5): 260-261.
- Scantlebury, R. A.; Wilkinson, P.T. (1971). The design of a switching system to allow remote access to computer services by other computers and terminal devices. Proceedings of the 2nd Symposium on Problems in the Optimization of Data Communications Systems. pp. 160–167.
- Scantlebury, R. A.; Wilkinson, P.T. (1974). The National Physical Laboratory Data Communications Network. Proceedings of the 2nd ICCC 74. pp. 223–228.
- Cerf, V.; McKenzie, A; Scantlebury, R; Zimmermann, H (1976). "Proposal for an international end to end protocol". ACM SIGCOMM Computer Communication Review. 6: 63–89. doi:10.1145/1015828.1015832. S2CID 36954091.

== See also ==
- History of the Internet
- Internet in the United Kingdom § History
- List of Internet pioneers
- Protocol Wars
