= International Packet Switched Service =

The International Packet Switched Service (IPSS) was the first international and commercial packet switching network. It was created in 1978 by a collaboration between Britain's Post Office Telecommunications, and the United States' Western Union International and Tymnet.

== History ==
This network grew from Europe and the United States to cover Canada, Hong Kong and Australia by 1981, and by the 1990s it provided a worldwide networking infrastructure.

Companies and individual users could connect in to the network, via a PSS (Packet Switch Stream) modem, or an X.25 PAD (packet assembler/disassembler), and a dedicated PSS line, and use it to connect to a variety of online databases and mainframe systems. There was a choice of about three different speeds of PSS lines, although a faster line was more costly to rent.

By 1984 British Telecom had joined the PSS to the global network and was providing IPSS services to customers. Companies including Dynatech, were providers of interconnectivity and infrastructure devices including line drivers, modems, self configuring modems, 4 port, 8 port and 16 port PADs, and switches. These were physical boxes delivering full implementation of x.25, x.28, x.29 and x.3 protocols with physical connectivity conforming to RS232 asynchronous connectivity specification.

JANET connections were available via IPSS. In 1988 the IPSS directory listed approximately 800 global sites available for connection via X.25.

The network later adopted TCP/IP and provided infrastructure for the early Internet.

== See also ==
- History of the Internet
- Internet in the United Kingdom
- Public data network

== Sources ==
- Schatt, Stan (1991). Linking LANs: A Micro Manager's Guide. McGraw-Hill. ISBN 0-8306-3755-9.
