= Transpac (data network) =

French public data network (1978-2012)

Transpac, also written TRANSPAC, was a French public data network that operated from the December 1978 to June 2012.

== History ==
The network was opened in December 1978 by the semi-public Transpac society. It offered the X.25 interface to its users, the CCITT standard of 1976 in which computer scientists of the Centre national d'études des télécommunications (CNET) had played a major role. This network was part of the worldwide X.25 network which, before the Internet, permitted data exchanges around the planet.

Initially created for professional customers, it was later used by millions of French terminals Minitels to access consumer applications, forerunners of those of the Internet. After high Minitel usage crashed the network in June 1985, Transpac separated Minitel traffic from that of business users.

In 1987, Transpac was the world's largest public packet-switched network with revenues of nearly $400m. Minitel videotex services accounted for 45% of its data and 20% of its $678m revenue in 1990. By 1991, it was operating in fifteen European countries.

France Télécom closed the Minitel service, and the Transpac network via which it was available, in June 2012.

== See also ==
- Internet in France
