= Packet switching =

Method for transmitting data over a computer network

In telecommunications, packet switching is a method of grouping data into short messages in fixed format, i.e., packets, that are transmitted over a telecommunications network. Packets consist of a header and a payload. The header directs the packet to its destination, where the payload is extracted and used by an operating system, application software, or higher-layer protocols. Packet switching is the primary basis for data communications in computer networks worldwide.

During the early 1960s, American engineer Paul Baran developed a concept he called distributed adaptive message block switching as part of a research program at the RAND Corporation, funded by the United States Department of Defense. His proposal was to provide a fault-tolerant, efficient method for communication of voice messages using low-cost hardware to route the message blocks across a distributed network. His ideas contradicted then-established principles of pre-allocation of network bandwidth, exemplified by the development of telecommunications in the Bell System. The new concept found little resonance among network implementers until the independent work of British computer scientist Donald Davies at the National Physical Laboratory beginning in 1965. Davies developed the concept for data communication using software switches in a high-speed computer network and coined the term packet switching. His work inspired numerous packet switching networks in the decade following, including the incorporation of the concept into the design of the ARPANET in the United States and the CYCLADES network in France. The ARPANET and CYCLADES were the primary precursor networks of the modern Internet.

== Concept ==
This animation illustrates a network model in which consecutive packets between hosts take differing routes. Out-of-order delivery is, however, detrimental to the performance of several network protocols, including TCP, so the Internet attempts to route packets associated with the same data stream along the same path most of the time.

A simple definition of packet switching is:

The routing and transferring of data by means of addressed packets so that a channel is occupied during the transmission of the packet only, and upon completion of the transmission the channel is made available for the transfer of other traffic.

Packet switching allows delivery of variable bit rate data streams, realized as sequences of short messages in fixed format, i.e. packets, over a computer network which allocates transmission resources as needed using statistical multiplexing or dynamic bandwidth allocation techniques. As they traverse networking hardware, such as switches and routers, packets are received, buffered, queued, and retransmitted (stored and forwarded), resulting in variable latency and throughput depending on link capacity and traffic load on the network. Packets are normally forwarded by intermediate network nodes asynchronously using first-in, first-out buffering, but may be forwarded according to some scheduling discipline for fair queuing, traffic shaping, or for differentiated or guaranteed quality of service, such as weighted fair queuing or leaky bucket. Packet-based communication may be implemented with or without intermediate forwarding nodes (switches and routers). In case of a shared physical medium (such as radio or 10BASE5), the packets may be delivered according to a multiple access scheme.

Packet switching contrasts with another principal networking paradigm, circuit switching, a method which pre-allocates dedicated network bandwidth specifically for each communication session, each having a constant bit rate and latency between nodes. In cases of billable services, such as cellular communication services, circuit switching is characterized by a fee per unit of connection time, even when no data is transferred, while packet switching may be characterized by a fee per unit of information transmitted, such as characters, packets, or messages.

A packet switch has four components: input ports, output ports, routing processor, and switching fabric.

== History ==
=== Invention and development ===
The "message block", designed by Paul Baran in 1962 and refined in 1964, is the first proposal of a data packet.

Packet-switching cost performance trends, 1960-1980.

The concept of switching small blocks of data was invented independently by Paul Baran at the RAND Corporation during the early 1960s in the US and Donald Davies at the National Physical Laboratory (NPL) in the UK in 1965.

In the late 1950s, the US Air Force established a wide area network for the Semi-Automatic Ground Environment (SAGE) radar defense system. Recognizing vulnerabilities in this network, the Air Force sought a system that might survive a nuclear attack to enable a response, thus diminishing the attractiveness of the first strike advantage by enemies (see Mutual assured destruction). In the early 1960s, Baran invented the concept of distributed adaptive message block switching in support of the Air Force initiative. The concept was first presented to the Air Force in the summer of 1961 as briefing B-265, later published as RAND report P-2626 in 1962, and finally in report RM 3420 in 1964. The reports describe a general architecture for a large-scale, distributed, survivable communications network. The proposal was composed of three key ideas: use of a decentralized network with multiple paths between any two points; dividing user messages into message blocks; and delivery of these messages by store and forward switching. Baran's network design was focused on high-speed digital communication of voice messages using hardware switches that were low-cost electronics.

Christopher Strachey, who became Oxford University's first Professor of Computation, filed a patent application in the United Kingdom for time-sharing in February 1959. In June that year, he gave a paper "Time Sharing in Large Fast Computers" at the UNESCO Information Processing Conference in Paris where he passed the concept on to J. C. R. Licklider. Licklider (along with John McCarthy) was instrumental in the development of time-sharing. After conversations with Licklider about time-sharing with remote computers in 1965, Davies independently invented a similar data communication concept. His insight was to use short messages in fixed format with high data transmission rates to achieve rapid communications. He went on to develop a design for a hierarchical, high-speed computer network including interface computers and communication protocols. He coined the term packet switching, and proposed building a commercial nationwide data network in the UK. He gave a talk on the proposal in 1966, after which a person from the Ministry of Defence (MoD) told him about Baran's work.

Roger Scantlebury, a member of Davies' team, presented their work (and referenced that of Baran) at the October 1967 Symposium on Operating Systems Principles (SOSP). At the conference, Scantlebury proposed packet switching for use in the ARPANET and persuaded Larry Roberts the economics were favorable to message switching. Davies had chosen some of the same parameters for his original network design as did Baran, such as a packet size of 1024 bits. To deal with packet permutations (due to dynamically updated route preferences) and datagram losses (unavoidable when fast sources send to a slow destination), he assumed that "all users of the network will provide themselves with some kind of error control", thus inventing what came to be known as the end-to-end principle. Davies proposed that a local-area network should be built at the laboratory to serve the needs of NPL and prove the feasibility of packet switching. After a pilot experiment in early 1969, the NPL Data Communications Network began service in 1970. Davies was invited to Japan to give a series of lectures on packet switching. The NPL team carried out simulation work on datagrams and congestion in networks on a scale to provide data communication across the United Kingdom.

Larry Roberts made the key decisions in the request for proposal to build the ARPANET. Roberts met Baran in February 1967, but did not discuss networks. He asked Frank Westervelt to explore the questions of message size and contents for the network, and to write a position paper on the intercomputer communication protocol, including "conventions for character and block transmission, error checking and retransmission, and computer and user identification." Roberts revised his initial design, which was to connect the host computers directly, to incorporate Wesley Clark's idea to use Interface Message Processors (IMPs) to create a message switching network, which he presented at SOSP. Roberts was known for making decisions quickly. Immediately after SOSP, he incorporated Davies' concepts and designs for packet switching to enable the data communications on the network, and sought input from Baran.

A contemporary of Roberts' from MIT, Leonard Kleinrock had researched the application of queueing theory in the field of message switching for his doctoral dissertation in 1961–62 and published it as a book in 1964. Davies, in his 1966 paper on packet switching, applied Kleinrock's techniques to show that "there is an ample margin between the estimated performance of the [packet-switched] system and the stated requirement" in terms of a satisfactory response time for a human user. This addressed a key question about the viability of computer networking. Larry Roberts brought Kleinrock into the ARPANET project informally in early 1967. Roberts and Taylor recognized the issue of response time was important, but did not apply Kleinrock's methods to assess this and based their design on a store-and-forward system that was not intended for real-time computing. After SOSP, and after Roberts' direction to use packet switching, Kleinrock sought input from Baran and proposed to retain Baran and RAND as advisors. The ARPANET working group assigned Kleinrock responsibility to prepare a report on software for the IMP. In 1968, Roberts awarded Kleinrock a contract to establish a Network Measurement Center (NMC) at UCLA to measure and model the performance of packet switching in the ARPANET.

Bolt Beranek & Newman (BBN) won the contract to build the network. Designed principally by Bob Kahn, it was the first wide-area packet-switched network with distributed control. The BBN "IMP Guys" independently developed significant aspects of the network's internal operation, including the routing algorithm, flow control, software design, and network control. The UCLA NMC and the BBN team also investigated network congestion. The Network Working Group, led by Steve Crocker, a graduate student of Kleinrock's at UCLA, developed the host-to-host protocol, the Network Control Program, which was approved by Barry Wessler for ARPA, after he ordered certain more exotic elements to be dropped. In 1970, Kleinrock extended his earlier analytic work on message switching to packet switching in the ARPANET.

The ARPANET was demonstrated at the International Conference on Computer Communication (ICCC) in Washington in October 1972. However, fundamental questions about the design of packet-switched networks remained.

Roberts presented the idea of packet switching to communication industry professionals in the early 1970s. Before ARPANET was operating, they argued that the router buffers would quickly run out. After the ARPANET was operating, they argued that packet switching would never be economically viable without the government subsidy. Baran had faced the same rejection and thus failed to convince the military to construct a packet-switching network in the 1960s.

The CYCLADES network was designed by Louis Pouzin in the early 1970s to study internetworking. It was the first to implement the end-to-end principle of Davies, and make the host computers responsible for the reliable delivery of data on a packet-switched network, rather than this being a service of the network itself. His team was thus first to tackle the highly-complex problem of providing user applications with a reliable virtual circuit service while using a best-effort service, an early contribution to what will be the Transmission Control Protocol (TCP).

Bob Metcalfe and others at Xerox PARC outlined the idea of Ethernet and the PARC Universal Packet (PUP) for internetworking.

In May 1974, Vint Cerf and Bob Kahn described the Transmission Control Program, an internetworking protocol for sharing resources using packet-switching among the nodes. The specifications of the TCP were then published in RFC 675 (Specification of Internet Transmission Control Program), written by Vint Cerf, Yogen Dalal and Carl Sunshine in December 1974.

The X.25 protocol, developed by Rémi Després and others, was built on the concept of virtual circuits. In the mid-to-late 1970s and early 1980s, national and international public data networks emerged using X.25, which was developed with participation from France, the UK, Japan, US and Canada. It was complemented with X.75 to enable internetworking.

In the late 1970s, the monolithic Transmission Control Program was layered as the Transmission Control Protocol (TCP), atop the Internet Protocol (IP). Many Internet pioneers developed this into the Internet protocol suite and the associated Internet architecture and governance that emerged in the 1980s.

Leonard Kleinrock carried out theoretical work at UCLA during the 1970s analyzing throughput and delay in the ARPANET. Kleinrock published hundreds of research papers, which ultimately launched a new field of research on the theory and application of queuing theory to computer networks. His work on hierarchical routing with student Farouk Kamoun became critical to the operation of the Internet.

Packet switching was shown to be optimal in the Huffman coding sense in 1978.

For a period in the 1980s and early 1990s, the network engineering community was polarized over the implementation of competing protocol suites, commonly known as the Protocol Wars. It was unclear which of the Internet protocol suite and the OSI model would result in the best and most robust computer networks.

Complementary metal–oxide–semiconductor (CMOS) VLSI (very-large-scale integration) technology led to the development of high-speed broadband packet switching during the 1980s–1990s.

=== The "paternity dispute" ===
In the 1978 special edition of the Proceedings of the IEEE on packet switching, Bob Kahn, the guest editor, wrote that "analysis has had little direct impact on the network design problem". In Roberts' paper on "Packet Switching Economics" for the L.M. Ericsson prize for research in data communications in 1982, he referenced only Davies' 1967 paper for SOSP, not the work of Baran or Kleinrock. Kleinrock's paper for the same prize was titled "Packet Switching Principles". In Roberts' 1986 conference paper on "The ARPANET & Computer Networks", he also cites Baran's 1964 paper and one of his own papers from 1966; but only references Kleinrock's work from the 1970s, which addressed the ARPANET. This paper was republished on the web by Roberts in 1995.

Roberts began to claim, in the late 1990s, that, by the time of the October 1967 SOSP, he already had the concept of packet switching in mind (although not yet named and not written down in his paper published at the conference, which a number of sources describe as "vague"), and that this originated with his old colleague, Kleinrock, who had written about such concepts in his Ph.D. research in 1961-2. In 1997, along with seven other Internet pioneers, Roberts and Kleinrock co-wrote "Brief History of the Internet" published by the Internet Society. In it, Kleinrock is described as having "published the first paper on packet switching theory in July 1961 and the first book on the subject in 1964". Many sources about the history of the Internet began to reflect these claims as uncontroversial facts. This became the subject of what Katie Hafner called a "paternity dispute" in The New York Times in 2001.

The disagreement about Kleinrock's contribution to packet switching escalated after a statement made on Kleinrock's profile on the UCLA Computer Science department website sometime in the 1990s. Here, he was referred to as the "Inventor of the Internet Technology". The webpage's depictions of Kleinrock's achievements provoked anger among some early Internet pioneers. The dispute over priority became a public issue after Donald Davies posthumously published a paper in 2001 in which he denied that Kleinrock's work in the early 1960s was related to packet switching, stating "I can find no evidence that he understood the principles of packet switching". Davies also described ARPANET project manager Larry Roberts as supporting Kleinrock, referring to Roberts' writings online and Kleinrock's UCLA webpage profile as "very misleading". Walter Isaacson wrote that Kleinrock's claims "led to an outcry among many of the other Internet pioneers, who publicly attacked Kleinrock and said that his brief mention of breaking messages into smaller pieces did not come close to being a proposal for packet switching".

Davies' paper reignited a previous dispute over who deserves credit for getting the ARPANET online between engineers at Bolt, Beranek, and Newman (BBN) who had been involved in building and designing the ARPANET IMP on the one side, and ARPA-related researchers on the other. This earlier dispute is exemplified by BBN's Will Crowther, who in a 1990 oral history described Paul Baran's packet switching design (which he called hot-potato routing), as "crazy" and non-sensical, despite the ARPA team having advocated for it. The reignited debate caused other former BBN employees to make their concerns known, including Alex McKenzie, who followed Davies in disputing that Kleinrock's work was related to packet switching, stating "... there is nothing in the entire 1964 book that suggests, analyzes, or alludes to the idea of packetization".

Former IPTO director Bob Taylor also joined the debate, stating that "authors who have interviewed dozens of Arpanet pioneers know very well that the Kleinrock-Roberts claims are not believed". Walter Isaacson notes that "until the mid-1990s Kleinrock had credited [Baran and Davies] with coming up with the idea of packet switching".

A subsequent version of Kleinrock's biography webpage was copyrighted in 2009 by Kleinrock. He was called on to defend his position over subsequent decades. A paper published in the journal Internet Histories in 2019 supported Kleinrock's view; the author interviewed Kleinrock and Roberts, and did not interview Scantlebury. In 2023, Kleinrock acknowledged that his work published in the early 1960s was about message switching and claimed he was thinking about packet switching. Primary sources and historians recognize Baran and Davies for independently inventing the concept of digital packet switching used in modern computer networking including the ARPANET and the Internet.

Kleinrock has received many awards for his ground-breaking applied mathematical research on packet switching, carried out in the 1970s, which was an extension of his pioneering work in the early 1960s on the optimization of message delays in communication networks. However, Kleinrock's claims that his work in the early 1960s originated the concept of packet switching and that his work was a source of the packet switching concepts used in the ARPANET have affected sources on the topic, which has created methodological challenges in the historiography of the Internet. Historian Andrew L. Russell said "'Internet history' also suffers from a ... methodological problem: it tends to be too close to its sources. Many Internet pioneers are alive, active, and eager to shape the histories that describe their accomplishments. Many museums and historians are equally eager to interview the pioneers and to publicize their stories".

== Connectionless and connection-oriented modes ==
Packet switching may be classified into connectionless packet switching, using datagrams, and connection-oriented packet switching, using virtual circuits. Examples of connectionless systems are Ethernet, IP, and the User Datagram Protocol (UDP). Connection-oriented systems include X.25, Frame Relay, Multiprotocol Label Switching (MPLS), and TCP.

In connectionless mode, each packet is labeled with a destination address, source address, and port numbers. It may also be labeled with the sequence number of the packet. This information eliminates the need for a pre-established path to help the packet find its way to its destination, but means that more information is needed in the packet header, which is therefore larger. The packets are routed individually, sometimes taking different paths, resulting in out-of-order delivery. At the destination, the original message may be reassembled in the correct order, based on the packet sequence numbers. Thus, a virtual circuit carrying a byte stream is provided to the application by a transport layer protocol, although the network only provides a connectionless network layer service.

Connection-oriented transmission requires a setup phase to establish the parameters of communication before any packet is transferred. The signaling protocols used for setup allow the application to specify its requirements and discover link parameters. Acceptable values for service parameters may be negotiated. The packets transferred may include a connection identifier rather than address information and the packet header can be smaller, as it only needs to contain this code and any information, such as length, timestamp, or sequence number, which is different for different packets. In this case, address information is only transferred to each node during the connection setup phase, when the route to the destination is discovered and an entry is added to the switching table in each network node through which the connection passes. When a connection identifier is used, routing a packet requires the node to look up the connection identifier in a table.

Connection-oriented transport layer protocols such as TCP provide a connection-oriented service by using an underlying connectionless network. In this case, the end-to-end principle dictates that the end nodes, not the network itself, are responsible for the connection-oriented behavior.

== Packet switching in networks ==
In telecommunication networks, packet switching is used to optimize the usage of channel capacity and increase robustness. Compared to circuit switching, packet switching is highly dynamic, allocating channel capacity based on usage instead of explicit reservations. This can reduce wasted capacity caused by underutilized reservations at the cost of removing bandwidth guarantees. In practice, congestion control is generally used in IP networks to dynamically negotiate capacity between connections. Packet switching may also increase the robustness of networks in the face of failures. If a node fails, connections do not need to be interrupted, as packets may be routed around the failure.

Packet switching is used in the Internet and most local area networks. The Internet is implemented by the Internet Protocol Suite using a variety of link layer technologies. For example, Ethernet and Frame Relay are common. Newer mobile phone technologies (e.g., GSM, LTE) also use packet switching. Packet switching is associated with connectionless networking because, in these systems, no connection agreement needs to be established between communicating parties prior to exchanging data.

X.25, the international CCITT standard of 1976, is a notable use of packet switching in that it provides to users a service of flow-controlled virtual circuits. These virtual circuits reliably carry variable-length packets with data order preservation. DATAPAC in Canada was the first public network to support X.25, followed by TRANSPAC in France.

Asynchronous Transfer Mode (ATM) is another virtual circuit technology. It differs from X.25 in that it uses small fixed-length packets (cells), and that the network imposes no flow control to users.

Technologies such as MPLS and the Resource Reservation Protocol (RSVP) create virtual circuits on top of datagram networks. MPLS and its predecessors, as well as ATM, have been called "fast packet" technologies. MPLS, indeed, has been called "ATM without cells". Virtual circuits are especially useful in building robust failover mechanisms and allocating bandwidth for delay-sensitive applications.

== Packet-switched networks ==
This list of packet-switched networks is divided into three overlapping eras: early, isolated, networks before the introduction of X.25; the X.25 era when many postal, telephone, and telegraph (PTT) companies provided public data networks with worldwide reach; and the modern Internet era, which initially competed with the OSI model.

The work of Donald Davies in the late 1960s on data communication and computer network design became well known in the United States, Europe and Japan. This was the "cornerstone" that inspired numerous packet switching networks in the decade following. (Full article...)

== See also ==
- Multi-bearer network
- Optical burst switching
- Packet radio
- Timeline of the history of the Internet
- Transmission delay
- Virtual private network
