= X.75 =

X.75 is an International Telecommunication Union (ITU) (formerly CCITT) standard specifying the interface for interconnecting two X.25 networks.

== Description ==
X.75 is almost identical to X.25. The significant difference is that while X.25 specifies the interface between a subscriber (Data Terminal Equipment (DTE)) and the network (Data Circuit-terminating Equipment (DCE)), X.75 specifies the interface between two networks (Signalling Terminal Equipment (STE)), and refers to these two STE as STE-X and STE-Y. This gives rise to some subtle differences in the protocol compared with X.25. For example, X.25 only allows network-generated reset and clearing causes to be passed from the network (DCE) to the subscriber (DTE), and not the other way around, since the subscriber is not a network. However, at the interconnection of two X.25 networks, either network might reset or clear an X.25 call, so X.75 allows network-generated reset and clearing causes to be passed in either direction.

Although outside the scope of both X.25 and X.75, which define external interfaces to an X.25 network, X.75 can also be found as the protocol operating between switching nodes inside some X.25 networks.

== See also ==
- Internetworking
- Public data network
- X.121
