= International Conference on Computer Communications =

The International Conference on Computer Communications is an annual conference organized by the Institute of Electrical and Electronics Engineers (IEEE) since 1982. A separate conference, of the same name, was held in 1972 to demonstrate the ARPANET. Several of the key participants in the 1972 conference were speakers at the 1982 conference.

== 1972 ICCC ==
The International Conference on Computer Communications was held October 24–26, 1972 in Washington, DC at the Hilton Washington.

ARPA IPTO Director Larry Roberts, who would serve as the conference's chair, decided that an international conference would be the ideal place to showcase the capabilities of ARPANET. The conference was organized by BBN Technologies under the direction of Bob Kahn and was one of the first public demonstrations of computer networking technology and functionality as well as products of the ARPANET project. With the help of MIT professor Al Vezza, Khan enlisted help from across the country of scientists and students working with ARPANET. A Terminal Interface Processor was installed at the Hilton, connected to ARPANET by a dedicated phone line installed by AT&T, and then connected to dozens of terminals set up on the floor.

The conference began with a VIP reception on the 22nd before opening on the 24th. Despite some initial technical problems, the ARPANET demo was a "mind-blowing" success, connecting attendees to systems across the nation and abroad to engage them in a variety of activities, including interacting with an air traffic control system and playing computer chess. The success of the demo prompted an acceleration of the use and expansion of ARPANET, bringing the network closer to becoming the modern Internet.

Bob Metcalfe wrote the "Scenarios" that described 19 ways the network could be used. Other US researchers participating in the conference included Steve Crocker, Vint Cerf and Jon Postel; other international researchers attending included Donald Davies and Peter T. Kirstein from the United Kingdom and Louis Pouzin and Rémi Després from France. Pouzin hosted an international conference the previous year in Paris, where Crocker, Pouzin, Davies, and Kirstein agreed to form the International Network Working Group (INWG). Crocker saw that it would be useful to have an international version of the Network Working Group, which developed the Network Control Program (NCP) for the ARPANET. At the ICCC, Cerf was chosen as INWG's Chair on Crocker's recommendation. In addition, at the ICCC, Pouzin discussed his ideas for the CYCLADES network in France, which would go to influence the design of the Transmission Control Program and TCP/IP.

== INFOCOM ==
The IEEE International Conference on Computer Communications, commonly known as IEEE INFOCOM, is a major annual conference on networking that has been held since 1982. It is sponsored by the IEEE Communications Society (ComSoc) and previously was jointly sponsored with the IEEE Computer Society.

=== History ===
The Technical Community on Computer Communications (TCCC) of the IEEE Computer Society (CS) began the LCN conference (now the IEEE Conference on Local Computer Networks) on September 16-17, 1976 in Minneapolis, Minnesota, sponsored by the University of Minnesota University Computer Center with the cooperation of Network Systems Corporation.

In the early 1980s, there was growing interest in data communications, a field pioneered in the 1960s by Donald Davies, as well as LAN technology, pioneered in the 1970s by Bob Metcalfe. In response, TCCC organized a conference meeting in 1982. Held in Las Vegas, Nevada, USA on March 30 – April 1, the General Chair was Harvey Freeman; TPC Chair was Vint Cerf; and keynote speakers were Larry Roberts and Bob Kahn. There were approximately 400 attendees; although this was half the number anticipated, the conference would be held again on an annual basis. It augmented, but did not replace, the existing Data Communications Symposium. It was a joint conference sponsored by the IEEE Computer Society (CS) and the IEEE Communications Society (ComSoc) until 2002 when it became solely sponsored by ComSoc.

The growing importance of the application of computers and database systems to communications and network management during the 1980s led to the 1987 inauguration of the IEEE Network Operations Management Symposium (NOMS).

INFOCOM has been held in many countries around the world, including Italy, Japan, Israel, Spain, and Brazil, as well as most regions of the US. It covers theoretical and systems research, including Internet technologies, wireless communications, and data centers.

2026 will be the 45th edition of the conference and will be held in Tokyo, Japan on 18-21 May 2026.

== See also ==
- History of the Internet
- Internet Experiment Note
- List of computer science conferences
- Protocol Wars
- Symposium on Operating Systems Principles
