= International Network Working Group =

The International Network Working Group (INWG) was a group of prominent computer science researchers in the 1970s who studied and developed standards and protocols for interconnection of computer networks. Set up in 1972 as an informal group to consider the technical issues involved in connecting different networks, its goal was to develop an international standard protocol for internetworking. INWG became a subcommittee of the International Federation for Information Processing (IFIP) the following year. Concepts developed by members of the group contributed to the Protocol for Packet Network Intercommunication proposed by Vint Cerf and Bob Kahn in 1974 and the Transmission Control Protocol and Internet Protocol (TCP/IP) that emerged later.

== History ==
=== Founding and IFIP affiliation ===
The International Network Working Group was formed by Steve Crocker, Louis Pouzin, Donald Davies, and Peter Kirstein in June 1972 in Paris at a networking conference organised by Pouzin. Crocker saw that it would be useful to have an international version of the Network Working Group, which developed the Network Control Program for the ARPANET.

At the International Conference on Computer Communication (ICCC) in Washington D.C. in October 1972, Vint Cerf was approved as INWG's Chair on Crocker's recommendation. (Note: Crocker recalls he allocated Cerf $50k funding for the role, although Kahn does not recall this.) The group included American researchers representing the ARPANET (Note: More specifically, McKenzie represented BBN and Cerf represented Stanford University.) and the Merit network, the French CYCLADES and RCP networks, (Note: Remi Despres, who represented the French RCP, was also a member.) and British teams working on the NPL network, EPSS, and European Informatics Network.

During early 1973, Pouzin arranged affiliation with the International Federation for Information Processing (IFIP). INWG became IFIP Working Group 1 under Technical Committee 6 (Data Communication) with the title "International Packet Switching for Computer Sharing" (WG6.1). This standing, although informal, enabled the group to provide technical input on packet networking to CCITT and ISO. Its purpose was to study and develop "international standard protocols for internetworking".

INWG published a series numbered notes, some of which were also RfCs.

=== Gateways/routers ===
The idea for a router (called a gateway at the time) was initially described in "INWG Note 1", a report written in October 1972 by Donald Davies (NPL, UK), P. Shanks (Post Office, UK), Frank Heart (BBN, US), B. Barker (BBN, US), Rémi Després (PTT, France), V. Detwiler (UBC, Canada) and O. Riml (Bell-Northern Research, Canada). These gateway devices were different from most previous packet switching schemes in two ways. First, they connected dissimilar kinds of networks, such as serial lines and local area networks. Second, they were connectionless devices, which had no role in assuring that traffic was delivered reliably, leaving that function entirely to the hosts. This particular idea, the end-to-end principle, had been pioneered in the CYCLADES network.

=== Proposal for an international end-to-end protocol ===
A second sub-group considered host-to-host protocol requirements. This group consisted of Barry Wessler (ARPA, US), Vint Cerf (Stanford University, US), Kjell Samuelson (Stockholm University), Derek Barber (NPL, UK), C.D. Shephard (Deptartment of Communications, Canada), Louis Pouzin (IRIA, France), Brian Sexton (NPL, UK), William Clipsham (UK), Keith Sandum, Alex McKenzie (BBN, US), and Jeremy Tucker (Logica, UK). In their initial report in October 1972, they listed existing protocols for various networks that they planned to review, including the "Walden Message-Switching Protocol, ARPA H-H Protocol, NPL High-Level Protocol, CYCLADES Protocol, SPSS Protocol, etc."

INWG met in New York in June 1973. Attendees included Cerf, Bob Kahn, Alex McKenzie, Bob Metcalfe, Roger Scantlebury, John Shoch and Hubert Zimmermann, among others. They discussed a first draft of an International Transmission Protocol (ITP). Zimmermann and Metcalfe dominated the discussions; Zimmermann had been working with Pouzin on the CYCLADES network while Metclafe, Shoch and others at Xerox PARC had been developing the idea of Ethernet and the PARC Universal Packet (PUP) for internetworking. Notes from the meetings were recorded by Cerf and McKenzie, which was circulated after the meeting (INWG 28). There was a follow-up meeting in July. Gerard LeLann and G. Grossman made contributions after the June meeting.

Building on this work, in September 1973, Kahn and Cerf presented a paper, Host and Process Level Protocols for Internetwork Communication, at the next INWG meeting at the University of Sussex in England (INWG 39). Their ideas were refined further in long discussions with Davies, Scantlebury, Pouzin and Zimmerman.

Pouzin circulated a paper on Interconnection of Packet Switching Networks in October 1973 (INWG 42), in which he introduced the term catenet for an interconnected network. Zimmerman and Michel Elie wrote a Proposed Standard Host-Host Protocol for Heterogenous Computer Networks: Transport Protocol in December 1973 (INWG 43). Pouzin updated his paper with A Proposal for Interconnecting Packet Switching Networks in March 1974 (INWG 60), published two months later in May. Zimmerman and Elie circulated a Standard host-host protocol for heterogeneous computer networks in April 1974 (INWG 61). Pouzin published An integrated approach to network protocols in May 1975.

Kahn and Cerf published a significantly updated and refined version of their proposal in May 1974, A Protocol for Packet Network Intercommunication. A later version of the paper acknowledged several people including members of INWG and attendees at the June 1973 meeting. It was updated in INWG 72/RFC 675 in December 1974 by Cerf, Yogen Dalal and Carl Sunshine, which introduced the term internet as a shorthand for internetwork.

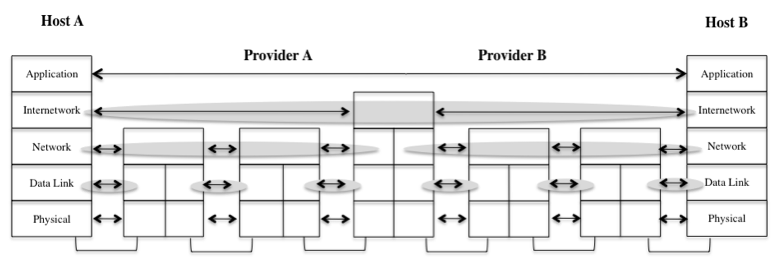
The Internet architecture as seen by the INWG.

Two competing proposals had evolved, the early Transmission Control Program (TCP), originally proposed by Kahn and Cerf, and the CYCLADES transport station (TS) protocol, proposed by Pouzin, Zimmermann and Elie. There were two sticking points: whether there should be fragmentation of datagrams (as in TCP) or standard-sized datagrams (as in TS); and whether the data flow was an undifferentiated stream or maintained the integrity of the units sent. These were not major differences. After "hot debate", McKenzie proposed a synthesis in December 1974, Internetwork Host-to-Host Protocol (INWG 74), which he refined the following year with Cerf, Scantlebury and Zimmerman (INWG 96).

After reaching agreement with the wider group, (Note: The group did not include Bob Kahn.) a Proposal for an international end to end protocol, was published by Cerf, McKenzie, Scantlebury, and Zimmermann in 1976. It was presented to the CCITT and ISO by Derek Barber, who became INWG chair earlier that year. Although the protocol was adopted by networks in Europe, it was not adopted by the CCITT, ISO nor the ARPANET.

The CCITT went on to adopt the X.25 standard in 1976, based on virtual circuits. ARPA funded testing of TCP in 1975 at Stanford, BBN and University College London. With funding from ARPA, another group published the Internet Experiment Notes from 1977 to 1982. This group developed TCP/IP, the Internet Protocol as connectionless layer on top of the Transmission Control Protocol as a reliable connection-oriented service, which reflects concepts in Pouzin's CYCLADES project.

=== Email ===
Ray Tomlinson proposed a network mail protocol in INWG Protocol note 2 (a separate series of INWG notes), in September 1974. Derek Barber proposed a network mail protocol and implemented it on the European Informatics Network, which he reported in INWG 192 in February 1979. His work was referenced by Jon Postel in his first paper on Internet email, published in the Internet Experiment Note series.

=== Later ===
Alex McKenzie served as chair from 1979-1982. A new international effort, beginning in 1978, led to the OSI model in 1984, of which many members of the INWG became advocates. During the Protocol Wars of the late 1980s and early 1990s, engineers, organizations and nations became polarized over the issue of which standard, the OSI model or the Internet protocol suite would result in the best and most robust computer networks. ARPA partnerships with the telecommunication and computer industry in the 1980s led to private sector adoption of the Internet protocol suite as a communication protocol.

McKenzie became the Secretary in 1983 and Carl Sunshine, who had worked with Vint Cerf and Yogen Dalal at Stanford on the first TCP specification, became the INWG chair until 1987, when Harry Rudin, at the IBM Zurich Research Laboratory, took over.

The INWG continued to work on protocol design and formal specification until the 1990s when it disbanded as the Internet grew rapidly. Nonetheless, issues with the Internet Protocol suite remain and alternatives have been proposed building on INWG ideas such as Recursive Internetwork Architecture.

== Legacy ==
The work of INWG was significant in the creation of routers, the Transmission Control Program, and email which all ultimately became pivotal in the working of the Internet.

... the International Network Working Group was created ... to draw a larger cohort of people into this whole question of how to design and build packet switch networks. That eventually led to the design of the Internet.

— Vint Cerf (2020)

== Members ==
The group had about 100 members; the initial two sub-groups consisted of the following:

- Derek Barber (NPL, UK)
- B. Barker (BBN, US)
- Vint Cerf (Stanford University, US)
- William Clipsham (Bell-Northern Research, Canada)
- Donald Davies (NPL, UK)
- Rémi Després (PTT, France)
- V. Detwiler (UBC, Canada)
- Frank Heart (BBN, US)
- Alex McKenzie (BBN, US)
- Louis Pouzin (IRIA, France)
- O. Riml (Bell-Northern Research, Canada)
- Kjell Samuelson (Stockholm University, Sweden)
- Keith Sandum (Post Office, UK)
- Brian Sexton (NPL, UK)
- P. Shanks (Post Office, UK)
- C.D. Shepard (Dept. of Communications, Canada)
- Jeremy Tucker (Logica, UK)
- Barry Wessler (ARPA, US)

== See also ==
- Coloured Book protocols
- History of email
- History of the Internet
- List of Internet pioneers
- Protocol Wars
- Public data network
