= Internet Experiment Note =

Technical publications related to development of precursors of the modern Internet

An Internet Experiment Note (IEN) is a sequentially numbered document in a series of technical publications issued by the participants of the early development work groups that created the precursors of the modern Internet.

== History ==
After DARPA began the Internet program in earnest in 1977, the project members were in need of communication and documentation of their work in order to realize the concepts laid out by Bob Kahn and Vint Cerf some years before. The Request for Comments (RFC) series was considered the province of the ARPANET project and the Network Working Group (NWG), which defined the network protocols used on it. Thus, the members of the Internet project decided to publish their own series of documents, Internet Experiment Notes, which were modeled after the RFCs.

Jon Postel became the editor of the new series, in addition to his existing role of administering the long-standing RFC series. Between March 1977 and September 1982, 206 IENs were published. After that, with the plan to terminate support of the Network Control Protocol (NCP) on the ARPANET and switch to TCP/IP, the production of IENs was discontinued, and all further publication was conducted within the existing RFC system.

The second, third and fourth versions of TCP, including the split into TCP/IP, were developed during the IEN work. The "Final Report" of the "TCP Project", mentions some of the people involved, including groups from Stanford University, University College London, USC-ISI, MIT, BBN, NDRE, among others.

Key networking principles, such as the robustness principle, were defined during the IEN work.

== See also ==
- History of the Internet
- International Conference on Computer Communications
- International Network Working Group
- List of Internet pioneers
- Protocol Wars
- Symposium on Operating Systems Principles
