= Network Control Protocol =

Network Control Protocol might refer to:

- Network Control Protocol (ARPANET), the initial ARPANET network protocol
- Network Control Protocol is part of the Point-to-Point Protocol

== See also ==
- Network Control Program (ARPANET), the software which implements the Network Control Protocol of the ARPANET
