= David Crocker =

David Crocker may refer to:

- David Crocker (academic)
- Dave Crocker (lawn bowler)
- Dave Crocker (engineer)
