= STD 8 =

STD 8 refers to a standard released by the Internet Engineering Task Force proposed by Jonathan B. Postel and Joyce K. Reynolds from University of Southern California Information Sciences Institute in their Request for Comments published in May 1983. Among other features Telnet protocol was assigned server port 23.

- RFC 854 – "TELNET PROTOCOL SPECIFICATION," Internet Standard 8.
- RFC 855 – "TELNET OPTION SPECIFICATION," Internet Standard 8.
