= Symposium on Operating Systems Principles =

Academic conferences on operating systems

The Symposium on Operating Systems Principles (SOSP), organized by the Association for Computing Machinery (ACM), is one of the most prestigious single-track academic conferences on operating systems.

Before 2023, SOSP was held every other year, alternating with the conference on Operating Systems Design and Implementation (OSDI); starting 2024, SOSP began to be held every year. The first SOSP was held in 1967. It is sponsored by the ACM's Special Interest Group on Operating Systems (SIGOPS).

== History ==
The inaugural conference was held in Gatlinburg, Tennessee on 1–4 October 1967 at the Mountain View Hotel. There were fifteen papers in total, of which three presentations were in the Computer Networks and Communications session. Larry Roberts presented his plan for the ARPANET, a computer network for resource sharing, which at that point was based on Wesley Clark's proposal for a message switching network. Jack Dennis from MIT discussed the merits of a more general data communications network. Roger Scantlebury, a member of Donald Davies' team from the UK National Physical Laboratory, presented their research on packet switching in a high-speed computer network, and referenced the work of Paul Baran. At this seminal meeting, Scantlebury proposed packet switching for use in the ARPANET and persuaded Roberts and Bob Taylor the economics were favorable to message switching. The ARPA team enthusiastically received the idea and Roberts incorporated it into the ARPANET design.

In total, 31 conferences have been held, seven of which were outside the USA. The first conference held outside the USA was in Saint-Malo, France in 1997. Other countries to have hosted the conference are Canada, the UK, Portugal, China, Germany and South Korea.

== List of conferences ==
From 1967 to 2023, the conferences were held every two years, with the first SOSP conference taking place in Gatlinburg, Tennessee. Beginning in 2024, SOSP the conference is held every year.

No	Year	Dates	Location
1	1967	Oct 1-4	Gatlinburg, TN USA
2	1969	Oct 20-22	Princeton, NJ USA
3	1971	Oct 18-20	Palo Alto, CA USA
4	1973	Oct 15-17	Yorktown Heights, NY USA
5	1975	Nov 19-21	Austin, TX USA
6	1977	Nov 16-18	West Lafayette, IN USA
7	1979	Dec 10-12	Pacific Grove, CA USA
8	1981	Dec 14-16	Pacific Grove, CA USA
9	1983	Oct 10-13	Bretton Woods, NH USA
10	1985	Dec 1-4	Orcas Island, WA USA
11	1987	Nov 8-11	Austin, TX USA
12	1989	Dec 3-6	Litchfield Park, AZ USA
13	1991	Oct 13-16	Pacific Grove, CA USA
14	1993	Dec 5-8	Asheville, NC USA
15	1995	Dec 3-6	Copper Mountain Resort, CO USA
16	1997	Oct 5-8	Saint-Malo, France
17	1999	Dec 12-15	Kiawah Island Resort, SC USA
18	2001	Oct 21-24	Chateau Lake Louise, Banff, Canada
19	2003	Oct 19-22	Bolton Landing, NY USA
20	2005	Oct 23-26	Brighton, UK
21	2007	Oct 14-17	Stevenson, WA USA
22	2009	Oct 11-14	Big Sky, MT USA
23	2011	Oct 23-26	Cascais, Portugal
24	2013	Nov 3-6	Farmington, PA USA
25	2015	Oct 4-7	Monterey, CA USA
26	2017	Oct 28-31	Shanghai, China
27	2019	Oct 27-30	Huntsville, Ontario, Canada
28	2021	Oct 25-28	Virtual Event
29	2023	Oct 23-26	Koblenz, Germany
30	2024	Nov 4-6	Austin, TX USA
31	2025	Oct 13-16	Seoul, South Korea

== See also ==
- History of the Internet
- International Conference on Computer Communications
- International Network Working Group
- Internet Experiment Note
- List of computer science conferences
- Protocol Wars
