= Dave Crocker (engineer) =

American network engineer

David H. Crocker
- Born: August 6, 1949 (age 77); Santa Monica, CA USA
- Occupation: Internet engineer

David Howard Crocker is an American network engineer, known for his work on the development of networked email since the early 1970s, when he worked with ARPANET (which became the technical foundation of the Internet) while he was an undergraduate student at UCLA. He was introduced to the ARPANET work by his brother, Steve Crocker, another pioneer of the Internet, who created the ARPA Network Working Group and the Request for Comments (RFC) series of formally published documents in 1969.

Crocker earned a Bachelor of Arts degree in Psychology at UCLA in 1975. While at UCLA, he was Director for the UCLA Helpline, a telephone crisis counseling service. He became a researcher at RAND Corporation in Los Angeles while pursuing a master's degree. At RAND, Crocker designed the "MS" Personal Messaging System. Following shortly after UCLA, RAND was one of a handful of places that had the earliest nodes of the Internet. In 1977 he obtained a Master of Arts degree at the USC Annenberg School for Communication, now called USC Annenberg School for Communication and Journalism. While doing additional graduate studies in Computer Science at the University of Delaware, from 1978 to 1982, he developed MMDF, a message transfer agent program for email servers. He ran MMDF as a telephone-based ARPANET gateway service for CSNET, which was a forerunner for NSFNET.

Crocker was the author of RFC 822, which was published in 1982 to define the format of Internet mail messages, and he was the first listed author of the earlier RFC 733 on which it was based in 1977. By 1974, the year before he obtained his bachelor's degree, he had been listed as an author or credited by name in at least 19 RFCs (351, 352, 462, 498, 539, 560, 577, 581, 585, 615, 645, and 651 through 658), most of which were focused on email or the Telnet protocol for client/server computer terminal communication. As of 2022, he had authored 68 RFCs.

He was co-architect and Director of System Development at MCI Digital Information Services Company on the MCI Mail service, and worked there with Vint Cerf to build it into a national email service. After working at MCI from 1983 to 1985, he held networking-related engineering management positions at Ungermann-Bass, The Wollongong Group, and Digital Equipment Corporation, before founding his own consultancy company, Brandenburg InternetWorking, in 1991. Since founding Brandenburg InternetWorking, he has had a role in founding several other companies and the Internet Mail Consortium.

He was one of the original IETF Area Directors, serving from 1989–1995.

== Awards and honors ==
Crocker received the 2004 IEEE Internet Award along with Raymond Tomlinson for their work on the "conceptualization, first implementation, and standardization of networked email".

== See also ==
- List of Internet pioneers
