= Larry Roberts (computer scientist) =

American electrical engineer and Internet pioneer

Lawrence Roberts
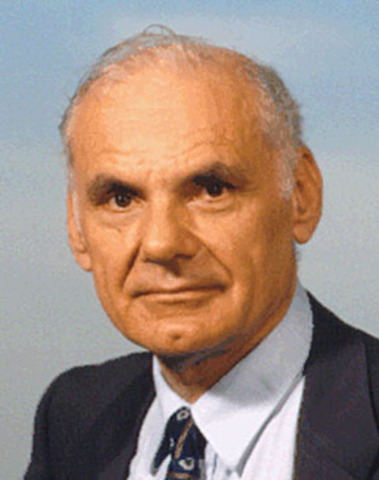
- Roberts in 2017
- Born: Lawrence Gilman Roberts; December 21, 1937; Westport, Connecticut, U.S.
- Died: December 26, 2018 (aged 81); Redwood City, California
- Education: Massachusetts Institute of Technology
- Known for: ARPANET, founding father of the Internet
- Awards: Internet Hall of Fame, 2012; IEEE Computer Pioneer Award; IEEE Computer Society W. Wallace McDowell Award; ACM SIGCOMM Award; Harry H. Goode Memorial Award; International Engineering Consortium Fellow award, 2001; Charles Stark Draper Prize of the National Academy of Engineering; Principe de Asturias Award, 2002; Secretary of Defense Meritorious Service Medal; Interface Conference Award; L.M. Ericsson prize for research in data communications, 1982
- Scientific career
- Fields: Computer science
- Workplaces: MIT Lincoln Laboratory, ARPA, Telenet, Anagran
- Academic advisors: Steven Anson Coons

Lawrence Gilman Roberts (December 21, 1937 – December 26, 2018) was an American computer scientist and Internet pioneer.

As a program manager and later office director at the Advanced Research Projects Agency, Roberts and his team created the ARPANET, the first wide-area computer network to implement packet switching techniques invented by British computer scientist Donald Davies and American engineer Paul Baran. The ARPANET's principal designer was Bob Kahn, alongside several other computer scientists from Bolt Beranek and Newman (BBN) who worked on the Interface Message Processors (IMPs) and their communication protocols. Roberts asked Leonard Kleinrock to apply mathematical methods to model and measure the performance of the network. In the 1970s, ARPA sponsored research on communication protocols for internetworking, using concepts pioneered by Louis Pouzin, that led to the development of the modern Internet.

After his work at ARPA, Roberts became CEO of the commercial packet-switching network Telenet, the first public data network in North America.

== Early life and education ==
Lawrence Gilman Roberts, who was known as Larry, was born and raised in Westport, Connecticut. He was the son of Elizabeth (Gilman) and Elliott John Roberts, both of whom had doctorates in chemistry. It is said that during his youth, he built a Tesla coil, assembled a television, and designed a telephone network built from transistors for his parents' Girl Scout camp.

Roberts attended the Massachusetts Institute of Technology (MIT), where he received his bachelor's degree (1959), master's degree (1960), and Doctor of Philosophy (Ph.D., 1963), all in electrical engineering. Due to his Ph.D. thesis "Machine Perception of Three-Dimensional Solids" he is known as the father of computer vision.

== Career ==
=== MIT ===
After receiving his PhD, Roberts continued to work at the MIT Lincoln Laboratory. Having read the seminal 1961 paper of the "Intergalactic Computer Network" by J. C. R. Licklider, Roberts developed a research interest in time-sharing using computer networks.

In a 1964 MIT video, Roberts explains and demonstrates Ivan Sutherland's pioneering computer graphics program Sketchpad, then hosted on the MIT Lincoln Laboratory TX-2 computer.

=== ARPA ===
In late 1966, although at first reluctant due to the administrative nature of the role, he was recruited by Robert Taylor in the ARPA Information Processing Techniques Office (IPTO) to become the program manager for the ARPANET. Roberts met Paul Baran in February 1967, but did not discuss networks. He asked Frank Westervelt to explore the initial design questions for a network. Roberts prepared a proposal that all host computers would connect to one another directly. Taylor and Wesley Clark disagreed with this design and Clark suggested the use of dedicated computers to create a message switching network, which were later called Interface Message Processors (IMPs).

At the Symposium on Operating System Principles (SOSP) that year, Roberts presented the plan based on Clark's message switching proposal. There he met Roger Scantlebury, a member of Donald Davies's team at the National Physical Laboratory in the United Kingdom, who presented their research on packet switching and suggested it for use in the ARPANET. Roberts applied Davies's concepts of packet switching for the ARPANET, and sought input from Paul Baran.

Roberts' plan for the ARPANET was the first wide area packet-switching network with distributed control, similar to Donald Davies' 1965 design. ARPA issued a request for quotation (RFQ) to build the system, which was awarded to Bolt, Beranek and Newman (BBN). Significant aspects of the network's operation including routing, flow control, software design and network control were developed by the BBN IMP team, which included Bob Kahn. Roberts managed its implementation and contracted with Leonard Kleinrock in 1968 to carry out mathematical modelling of the packet-switched network's performance. Roberts engaged Howard Frank to consult on the topological design of the network. Frank made recommendations to increase throughput and reduce costs in a scaled-up network. When Robert Taylor was sent to Vietnam in 1969 and then resigned, Roberts became director of the IPTO. He hired Barry Wessler to oversee development of the ARPANET host-to-host protocol.

Roberts became a champion of packet switching. In 1970, he proposed to NPL's Donald Davies that the two organizations connect their networks via a satellite link. This original proposal proved infeasible, but in 1971 Peter Kirstein agreed to Roberts' proposal to connect his research group at University College London (UCL) instead. UCL provided interconnection with British academic networks, forming the first international resource sharing network. Roberts anticipated in 1973 that it would be possible to use a satellite's 64 kilobit/second link as a medium shared by multiple satellite earth stations within the beam's footprint. This was implemented later by Bob Kahn, and resulted in SATNET.

The Purdy Polynomial hash algorithm was developed for the ARPANET to protect passwords in 1971 at the request of Roberts.

Roberts approached AT&T in the early 1970s about taking over the ARPANET to offer a public packet switched service but they declined.

In July 1972, he took the idea of READMAIL, which dumped all "recent" messages onto the user's terminal, and wrote a program for TENEX in TECO macros called RD, which permitted access to individual messages.

In early 1973, Roberts predicted the network would run out of capacity in nine months. In practice, it was found that the time-sharing host computers ran out of capacity before the network did.

=== Telenet ===
In 1973, Roberts left ARPA to join BBN's effort to commercialize the nascent packet-switching technology in the form of Telenet, the first FCC-licensed public data network in the United States. He was its CEO from 1973 to 1980. Roberts joined the international effort to standardize a protocol for packet switching based on virtual circuits shortly before it was finalized. Telenet converted to the X.25 protocol, which was adopted by PTTs across North America and Europe for public data networks in the mid-late 1970s. Roberts promoted this approach over the datagram approach in TCP/IP being pursued by ARPA, which he described as "oversold" in 1978.

=== Later career ===
In 1983 he joined DHL Corporation as President. At the time, he predicted bandwidths would go down driven by voice compression technology.

He was CEO of NetExpress, an Asynchronous Transfer Mode (ATM) equipment company, from 1983 to 1993. Roberts was president of ATM Systems from 1993 to 1998. He was chairman and CTO of Caspian Networks, but left in early 2004; Caspian ceased operation in late 2006.

As of 2011, Roberts was the founder and chairman of Anagran Inc. Anagran continues work in the same area as Caspian: IP flow management with improved quality of service for the Internet.

Since September 2012, he was CEO of Netmax in Redwood City, California.

== Packet switching 'paternity dispute' ==
Roberts claimed in the late 1990s that, by the time of the October 1967 Symposium on Operating System Principles (SOSP), he already had the concept of packet switching in mind (although not yet named and not written down in his paper published at the conference, which a number of sources describe as "vague"). Furthermore, he claimed that his experiment with Thomas Marill in October 1965, was based on packet switching; and that their subsequent paper, Towards a Cooperative Network of Time-Shared Computers, published the following year, was a blueprint for the ARPANET. In addition, he began describing himself as having been the "Chief Scientist" at ARPA. These claims have been reflected in publications about the history of the ARPANET and the Internet, and became part of the packet switching 'paternity dispute'.

Roberts' role at ARPA was largely administrative and managerial. His early work, prior to SOSP, has been described as "extend[ing] the concept of a support graphics processor to the idea of a network" using "existing telegraphic techniques". In his paper on "Packet Switching Economics" for the L.M. Ericsson prize for research in data communications, 1982, he referenced Davies' 1967 paper for SOSP, and no earlier papers. Primary sources and historians recognize Baran and Davies for independently inventing the concept of digital packet switching used in modern computer networking including the ARPANET and the Internet.

== Personal life ==
Roberts married and divorced four times. At the time of his death, his partner was physician Tedde Rinker. Roberts died at his California home from a heart attack on December 26, 2018.

== Awards and honors ==
- IEEE Harry H. Goode Memorial Award (1976), "In recognition of his contributions to the architectural design of computer-communication systems, his leadership in creating a fertile research environment leading to advances in computer and satellite communications techniques, his role in the establishment of standard international communication protocols and procedures, and his accomplishments in development and demonstration of packet switching technology and the ensuing networks which grew out of this work."
- Member, National Academy of Engineering (1978)
- L.M. Ericsson Prize (1982) in Sweden
- Computer Design Hall of Fame Award (1982)
- IEEE W. Wallace McDowell Award (1990), "For architecting packet switching technology and bringing it into practical use by means of the ARPA network."
- Association for Computing Machinery SIGCOMM Award (1998), for "visionary contributions and advanced technology development of computer communication networks".
- IEEE Internet Award (2000) For "early, preeminent contributions in conceiving, analyzing and demonstrating packet-switching networks, the foundation technology of the Internet."
- International Engineering Consortium Fellow Award (2001)
- National Academy of Engineering Charles Stark Draper Prize (2001), "for the development of the Internet"
- Principe de Asturias Award 2002 in Spain "for designing and implementing a system that is changing the world by providing previously unthought of opportunities for social and scientific progress."
- NEC C&C Award (2005) in Japan "For Contributions to Establishing the Foundation of Today's Internet Technology through ... the Design and Development of ARPANET and Other Early Computer Networks that were Part of the Initial Internet."
- In 2012, Roberts was inducted into the Internet Hall of Fame by the Internet Society.

== See also ==
- History of the Internet
- Internet pioneers
- Computer Networks: The Heralds of Resource Sharing
