= Steve Crocker =

American computer scientist and Internet pioneer (born 1944)

Stephen D. Crocker
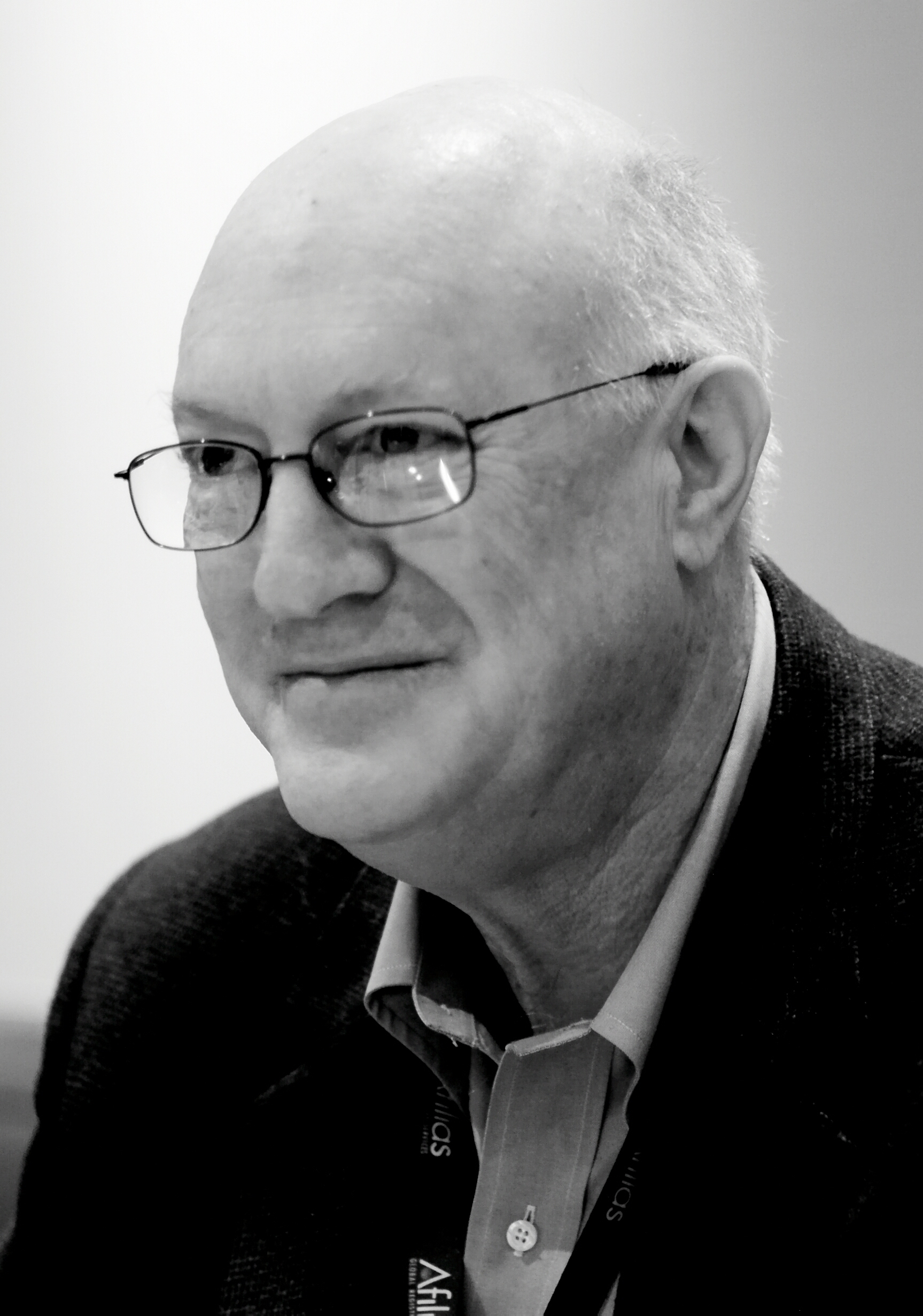
- Crocker in 2007
- Born: October 15, 1944 (age 81)
- Occupation: Internet engineer

Stephen D. Crocker (born October 15, 1944) is an American Internet pioneer. In 1969, he created the ARPA "Network Working Group" and the Request for Comments series. He served as chair of the board of the Internet Corporation for Assigned Names and Numbers (ICANN) from 2011 through 2017.

== Education ==
Steve Crocker attended Van Nuys High School, as did Vint Cerf and Jon Postel. Crocker received his bachelor's degree (1968) and PhD (1977) from the University of California, Los Angeles.

== Career ==
As a graduate student at the University of California Los Angeles (UCLA) in the 1960s, he was part of the team that developed the protocols for the ARPANET which were the foundation for today's Internet. He said "While much of the development proceeded according to a grand plan, the design of the protocols and the creation of the RFCs was largely accidental." (Note: RFCs began as informal technical notes, "requests for comments", of the Networking Working Group (NWG).) He was instrumental in forming a Network Working Group (NWG) in 1969 and was the instigator of the Request for Comment (RFC) series, authoring the first RFC and many more. Crocker led other graduate students, including Jon Postel and Vint Cerf, in designing a host-host protocol known as the Network Control Program (NCP). (Note: Crocker said "NCP" later came to be used as the name for the protocol, but it originally meant the program within the operating system that managed connections. The protocol itself was known blandly only as the host-host protocol.') They planned to use separate protocols, Telnet and the File Transfer Protocol (FTP), to run functions across the ARPANET. (Note: The NPL network team also envisaged the need for levels of data transmission in 1968. Both were early examples of the protocol layering concept incorporated in the OSI model.) NCP codified the ARPANET network interface, making it easier to establish, and enabling more sites to join the network.

He formed the International Network Working Group (INWG) in 1972, then his research interests shifted to artificial intelligence. He was acknowledged by Cerf and Kahn in their seminal 1974 paper on internetworking.

While at UCLA Crocker taught an extension course on computer programming (for the IBM 7094 mainframe computer). The class was intended to teach digital processing and assembly language programming to high school teachers, so that they could offer such courses in their high schools. A number of high school students were also admitted to the course, to ensure that they would be able to understand this new discipline. Crocker was also active in the newly formed UCLA Computer Club.

Crocker has been a program manager at Defense Advanced Research Projects Agency (DARPA), a senior researcher at USC's Information Sciences Institute, founder and director of the Computer Science Laboratory at The Aerospace Corporation and a vice president at Trusted Information Systems. In 1994, Crocker was one of the founders and chief technology officer of CyberCash, Inc. In 1998, he founded and ran Executive DSL, a DSL-based ISP. In 1999 he cofounded and was CEO of Longitude Systems. He is currently CEO of Shinkuro, a research and development company.

The Networking Working Group RFC's provided the context in which the IETF was created in 1986. He has been an IETF security area director, a member of the Internet Architecture Board, chair of the ICANN Security and Stability Advisory Committee, board member and chairman of ICANN, a board member of the Internet Society and numerous other Internet-related volunteer positions.

== Awards ==
He has worked in the Internet community since its inception. For his work on the Internet, Crocker was awarded the 2002 IEEE Internet Award. In 2012, Crocker was inducted into the Internet Hall of Fame by the Internet Society.

On November 6, 2024, Dr. Crocker received the Jonathan B. Postel Award during the 121st IETF meeting in Dublin, Ireland. He was named as an ACM Fellow, in the 2024 class of fellows, "for pioneering leadership in the design of the Arpanet Host-Host Protocols and applications".

== See also ==
- List of Internet pioneers

== Sources ==
- Hafner, Katie; Lyon, Matthew (August 19, 1999) [1996]. Where Wizards Stay Up Late: The Origins Of The Internet. Simon and Schuster. ISBN 978-0-684-87216-2.
