= Jon Postel =

American computer scientist and Internet pioneer (1943–1998)

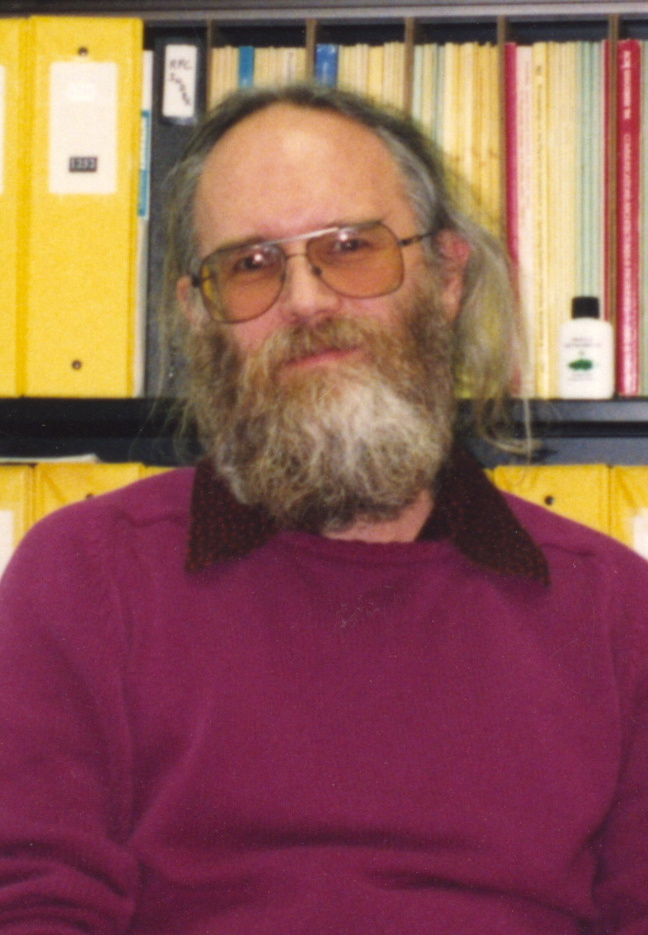
- Born: August 6, 1943; Altadena, California, U.S.
- Died: October 16, 1998 (aged 55); Santa Monica, California, U.S.
- Education: University of California, Los Angeles (BS, MS, PhD)
- Known for: Request for Comment; Internet Assigned Numbers Authority; Postel's Law
- Awards: Internet Hall of Fame Pioneer, Posthumous Recipient (2012), ACM SIGCOMM Award (1997), ITU Silver Medal (1998), ISOC Jonathan B. Postel Service Award (1999, posthumous)
- Scientific career
- Fields: Computer science
- Doctoral advisor: Dave Farber

Jonathan Bruce Postel (/pəˈstɛl/; August 6, 1943 – October 16, 1998) was an American computer scientist who made many significant contributions to the development of the Internet, particularly with respect to standards. He is known principally for being the editor of the Request for Comment (RFC) document series, for Simple Mail Transfer Protocol (SMTP), and for administering the Internet Assigned Numbers Authority (IANA) until his death.

During his lifetime he was referred to as the "god of the Internet" for his comprehensive influence; Postel himself noted that this "compliment" came with a barb, the suggestion that he should be replaced by a "professional," and responded with typical self-effacing matter-of-factness: "Of course, there isn’t any 'God of the Internet.' The Internet works because a lot of people cooperate to do things together."

== Career ==
Postel attended Van Nuys High School with Steve Crocker and Vint Cerf, and then UCLA where he earned his B.S. (1966) as well as his M.S. (1968) in Engineering. There he completed his Ph.D. in computer science in 1974, with Dave Farber as his thesis advisor.

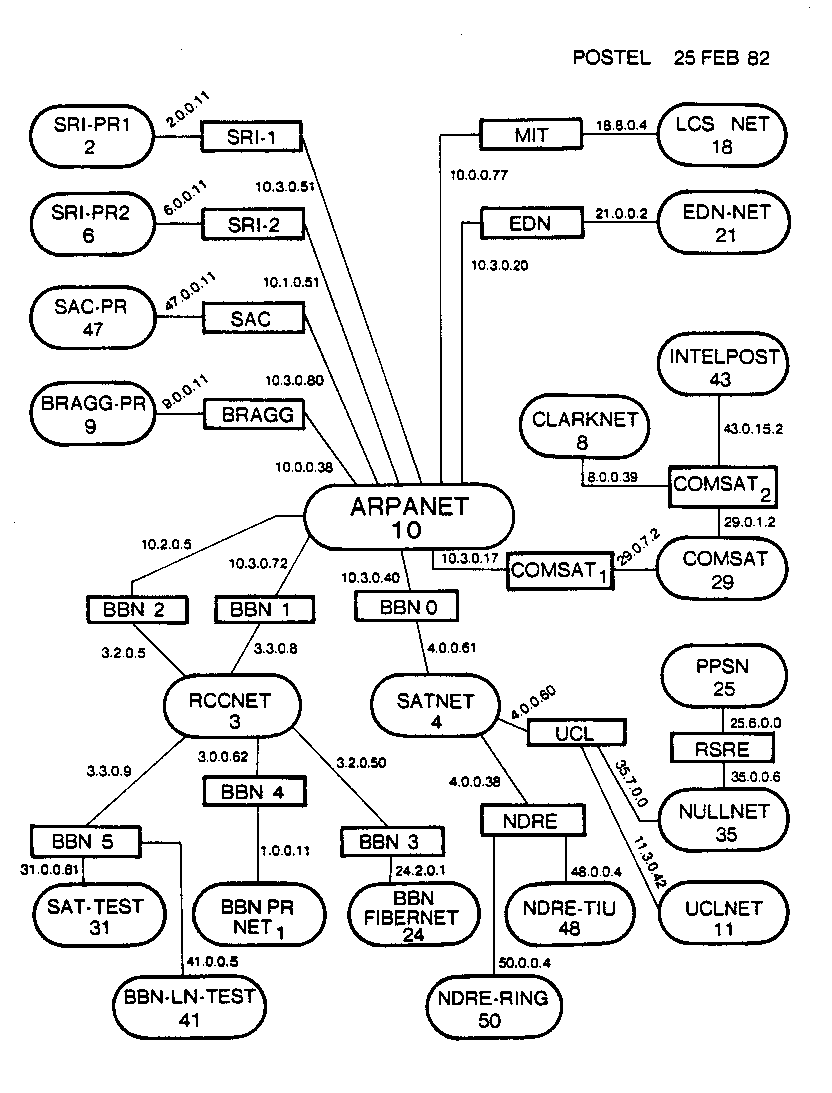
Map of the Internet, created by Jon Postel in 1982

Postel started work at UCLA on 23 December 1969 as a Postgraduate Research Engineer (I) where he was involved in early work on the ARPANET. He was involved in the development of the Internet domain system and, at his instigation, Vint Cerf and Bob Kahn developed a second set of protocols for handling data between networks, which is now known as Internet protocol suite. Together with Cerf and Steve Crocker, Postel worked on implementing most of the ARPANET protocols. Cerf would later become one of the principal designers of the TCP/IP standard, which works because of the sentence known as Postel's Law.

Postel worked with ARPANET until 24 August 1973 when he left to join MITRE Corporation. He assisted with Network Information Center, which was being set up at SRI by Elizabeth Feinler. In March 1977, he joined the Information Sciences Institute at the University of Southern California as a research scientist.

Postel was the RFC Editor from 1969 until his death, and wrote and edited many important RFCs, including RFC 791, RFC 792 and RFC 793, which define the basic protocols of the Internet protocol suite, and RFC 2223, Instructions to RFC Authors. Between 1982 and 1984 Postel co-authored the RFCs which became the foundation of today's DNS (RFC 819, RFC 881, RFC 882 and RFC 920) which were joined in 1995 by RFC 1591 which he also co-wrote. In total, he wrote or co-authored more than 200 RFCs.

Postel served on the Internet Architecture Board and its predecessors for many years. He was the Director of the names and number assignment clearinghouse, the Internet Assigned Numbers Authority (IANA), from its inception. He was the first member of the Internet Society, and was on its Board of Trustees. He was the original and long-time .us Top-Level Domain administrator. He also managed the Los Nettos Network.

All of the above were part-time activities he assumed in conjunction with his primary position as Director of the Computer Networks Division, Division 7, of the Information Sciences Institute at the University of Southern California.

=== DNS Root Authority test, U.S. response ===
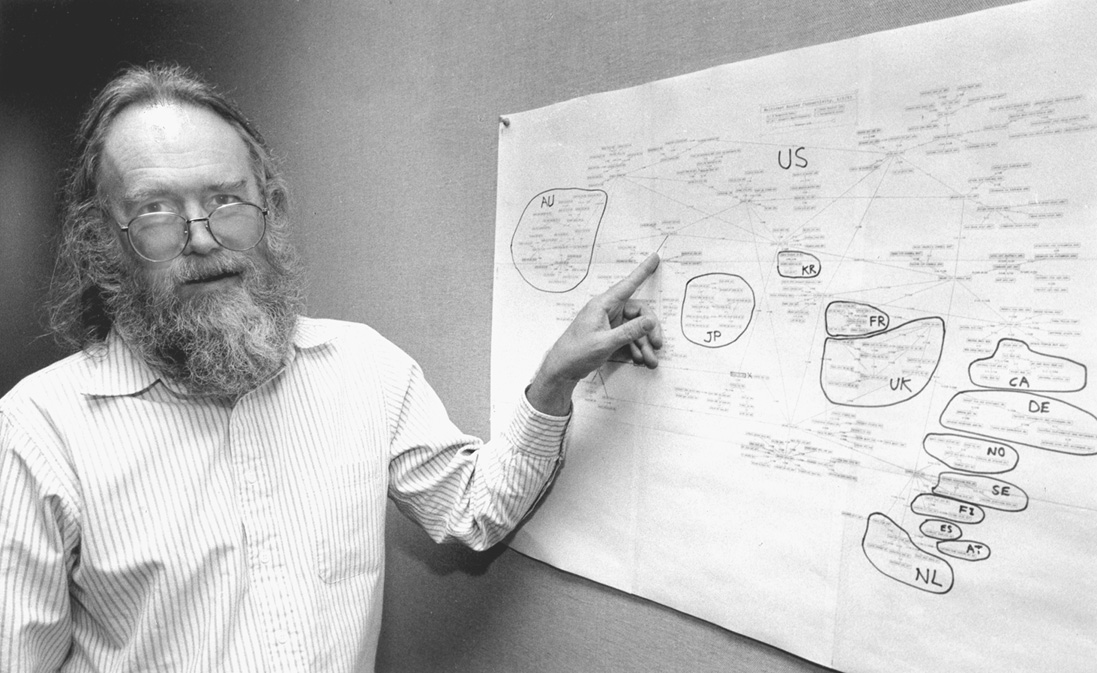
Postel in 1994 with map of Internet top-level domains

On January 28, 1998, Postel, as a test, emailed eight of the twelve operators of Internet's regional root nameservers on his own authority and instructed them to reconfigure their servers, changing the root zone server from then SAIC subsidiary Network Solutions' A.ROOT-SERVERS.NET (198.41.0.4) to IANA's DNSROOT.IANA.ORG (198.32.1.98). The operators complied with Postel's instructions, thus dividing control of Internet naming between the non-government operators with IANA and the 4 remaining U.S. Government roots at NASA, DoD, and BRL with NSI. Though usage of the Internet was not interrupted, Postel was threatened by US Presidential science advisor Ira Magaziner with the statement "You'll never work on the Internet again" and was ordered to end the test, which he did. Within a week, the US NTIA issued A proposal to improve technical management of Internet names and addresses, including changes to authority over the Internet DNS root zone, which ultimately, and controversially, increased U.S. control.

== Death ==
On October 16, 1998, Postel died of complications from heart surgery in Los Angeles. He was recovering from a surgery to replace a leaking heart valve.

== Legacy ==
The significance of Jon Postel's contributions to building the Internet, both technical and personal, were such that a memorial recollection of his life and his work forms part of the core technical literature sequence of the Internet in the form of RFC 2468 – "I Remember IANA," , written by Vint Cerf.

The Postel Center at Information Sciences Institute, University of Southern California, is named in his honor, as is the annual Postel Award. In 2012, Postel was inducted into the Internet Hall of Fame. The Channel Islands' Domain Registry building was named after him in early 2016.

Another tribute, RFC 2441 – "'Working with Jon' Tribute delivered at UCLA, October 30, 1998," , was written by Danny Cohen.

Perhaps his most famous legacy is from RFC 760, which includes a robustness principle often called Postel's law: "an implementation should be conservative in its sending behavior, and liberal in its receiving behavior" (reworded in RFC 1122 as: "Be liberal in what you accept, and conservative in what you send.").

The Jonathan B. Postel Service Award is an award named after Postel. The award has been presented most years since 1999 by the Internet Society to "honor a person who has made outstanding contributions in service to the data communications community." The first recipient of the award was Postel himself, posthumously. The award was created by Vint Cerf as chairman of the Internet Society and announced in "I remember IANA"

== Personal life ==
Jon was born in Altadena, California to Lois and Ed Postel. He was survived by his companion Susan Gould.

== See also ==
- Computer Networks: The Heralds of Resource Sharing – 1972 documentary film
- History of the Internet
- List of Internet pioneers
- STD 8
