= Yoram Ofek =

Professor

Yoram Ofek (Hebrew: יורם אופק; September 25, 1950 – December 9, 2009) was a Marie Curie Chair and full professor in the Information Engineering and Computer Science Department at the University of Trento, Italy. He was the inventor of 45 US and European patents and published more than 120 journal and conference papers. He invented several novel architectures for networking, computing and storage. He was elected IEEE Fellow in 2006 for his contributions to switching, scheduling and synchronization in data networks.

== Education and career ==
Ofek was born in Kibbutz Ramat David, Israel. He received his B.Sc. degree in electrical engineering from the Technion-Israel Institute of Technology, and his M.Sc. and Ph.D. degrees in electrical engineering from the University of Illinois-Urbana-Champaign.

In 1979 Yoram Ofek was a researcher at Rafael Advanced Defense Systems, and in 1982 at Fermi National Accelerator Laboratory. In 1987 he became research staff member at IBM T. J. Watson Research Center. In 1998 Prof. Ofek and Prof. Mario Baldi founded Synchrodyne Networks, a company that developed switching technology for the Internet.

He became the Marie Curie Chair and full professor at the University of Trento in 2004, where he also taught graduate and master level courses.

== Research ==
Prof. Ofek was directing IP-FLOW (a recursive acronym for "IP FLows over Optical and Wireless"). The focus of IP-FLOW was the flow control of IP packets over the Internet.

== Awards ==
- IEEE Fellow.
- IEEE ICC-007 ONS Best Paper Award: "Scalable Switching Testbed not 'Stopping' the Serial Bit Stream," (with D. Agrawal, M. Baldi, M. Corra, G. Fontana, G. Marchetto, V. T. Nguyen, D. Severina, T. H. Truong).
- IEEE ICC-2009 - Best Paper Award (First International Workshop on Green Communications): "Time for a 'Greener' Internet," (with Mario Baldi).
- IBM Outstanding Innovation Award for his invention of the MetaRing architecture and his contributions to the SSA storage products.
- IBM Research Division Award for developing the PARIS high-speed networking prototype system.
- Four IBM Invention Achievement Awards.
- Three IBM External Honors.
- Three commendations of excellence for his research at Rafael.

== Articles about some of Yoram Ofek's inventions ==
Pipeline forwarding
Time-driven switching
Fractional lambda switching
Time-driven priority
