= Network address =

Identifier for a node or network interface in a telecommunications network

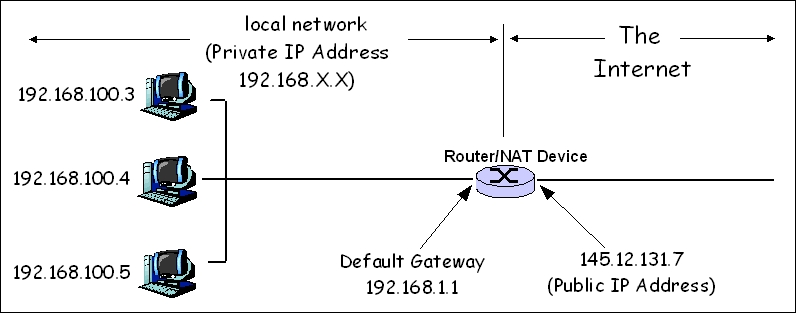
Network diagram with IP network addresses indicated e.g. 192.168.100.3.

A network address is an identifier for a node or host on a telecommunications network. Network addresses are designed to be unique identifiers across the network, although some networks allow for local, private addresses, or locally administered addresses that may not be unique. Special network addresses are allocated as broadcast or multicast addresses. These, too, are not unique.

In some cases, network hosts may have more than one network address. For example, each network interface controller may be uniquely identified. Further, because protocols are frequently layered, more than one protocol's network address can occur in any particular network interface or node, and more than one type of network address may be used in any one network.

Network addresses can be flat addresses, which contain no information about the node's location in the network (such as a MAC address), or may contain structure or hierarchical information for the routing (such as an IP address).

== Examples ==
Examples of network addresses include:

- Telephone number, in the public switched telephone network
- IP address in IP networks including the Internet
- IPX address, in NetWare
- X.25 or X.21 address, in a circuit switched data network
- MAC address, in Ethernet and other related IEEE 802 network technologies
