= X.3 =

X.3 is an ITU-T standard indicating what functions are to be performed by a Packet Assembler/Disassembler (PAD) when connecting character-mode data terminal equipment (DTE), such as a computer terminal, to a packet switched network such as an X.25 network, and specifying the parameters that control this operation.

The following is list of X.3 parameters associated with a PAD:

- 1 PAD recall using a character
- 2 Echo
- 3 Selection of data forwarding character
- 4 Selection of idle timer delay
- 5 Ancillary device control
- 6 Control of PAD service signals
- 7 Operation on receipt of break signal
- 8 Discard output
- 9 Padding after carriage return
- 10 Line folding
- 11 DTE speed
- 12 Flow control of the PAD
- 13 Linefeed insertion after carriage return
- 14 Padding after linefeed
- 15 Editing
- 16 Character delete
- 17 Line delete
- 18 Line display
- 19 Editing PAD service signals
- 20 Echo mask
- 21 Parity treatment
- 22 Page wait
