= Audio over IP =

Distribution of live digital audio across an IP network

Audio over IP (AoIP) is the distribution of digital audio across an IP network such as the Internet. It is used increasingly to provide high-quality audio feeds over long distances. The application is also known as audio contribution over IP (ACIP) in reference to the programming contributions made by field reporters and remote events. Audio quality and latency are key issues for contribution links. In the past, these links have made use of ISDN services but these have become increasingly difficult or expensive to obtain.

Many proprietary systems came into existence for transporting high-quality audio over IP based on Transmission Control Protocol (TCP), User Datagram Protocol (UDP) or Real-time Transport Protocol (RTP). Most use many of the same protocols as are used by voice over IP. An interoperable standard for audio over IP using RTP has been published by the European Broadcasting Union (EBU).

Within a single building or music venue, audio over Ethernet is more likely to be used instead, avoiding audio data compression and, in some cases, IP encapsulation.

== Technology ==
The European Broadcasting Union (EBU), together with many equipment manufacturers, defined a common framework for audio contribution over IP in order to achieve interoperability between products. The framework defines RTP as a common protocol and media payload type formats according to IETF definitions. Session Initiation Protocol (SIP) is used for call setup and control. The recommendation is published as EBU Tech 3326–2007.

More advanced audio codecs are capable of sending audio over unmanaged IP networks like the Internet using automated jitter buffering, forward error correction and error concealment to minimise latency and maximise packet streaming stability in live broadcast situations over unmanaged IP networks.

In the face of IPv4 address exhaustion, IPv6 capability ensures codecs are capable of connecting over new Internet infrastructure. IPv6 infrastructure is being widely deployed to deliver a virtually inexhaustible supply of IP addresses. IPv6 addressing makes it much easier for broadcast codecs to connect to each other directly and perform flexible multi-point connections over IP.

=== Codecs ===
In broadcasting, an IP audio codec is used to send broadcast-quality audio over IP from remote locations to radio and television studios around the globe. A codec that uses Internet Protocol (IP) may be used in remote broadcasts, as studio/transmitter links (STLs) or for studio-to-studio audio distribution. IP audio codecs use audio compression algorithms to send high-fidelity audio over both wired broadband IP networks and wireless 3G, 3.5G, 4G and 5G cellular broadband networks.

Broadcasters are migrating to low-cost wired and wireless audio over IP instead of older and more costly fixed-line technologies such as ISDN, X.21 and POTS/PSTN. ISDN and POTS/PSTN leased lines are also being phased out in Europe and Australia, increasing the push into IP technologies for audio broadcasting.

The latest IP audio codecs can send broadcast audio over stereo unicast, multicast and multiple unicast connections. Using multicast and multiple unicast connections, audio can be sent over IP networks from one IP audio codec to several destination audio codecs. IP codecs generally use SIP in order to connect to a variety of different codecs designed by different manufacturers. IP audio codecs are available for wired and wireless broadband IP codec solutions. IP audio codecs are used in professional studio transmitter links (STLs) and studio networking. Traditionally, these links have been implemented using telecommunication circuits contracted from telephone companies to provide fixed bandwidth. With the advent of IP technology, broadcasters have been reducing these operational costs by replacing their existing synchronous networks with packetized ones.

== Examples of use ==
The BBC began using audio contribution over IP in Scotland as part of the BBC Pacific Quay development in Glasgow. A similar system has been installed in the Regions of England and will be installed in Wales and Northern Ireland. The audio packets are sent using UDP over the BBC's Layer-3 network. To reduce the chance that the audio is corrupted, quality of service (QoS) is set to ensure that the packets are given priority over other network traffic. The platforms used are the WorldNet Oslo for multiple channel contribution and distribution with the WorldCast Horizon deployed in stereo drop-off locations.

Audio over IP is even used for large sports events. More than 1000 Barix IP audio codecs were used to network the various venues of the 2010 Commonwealth Games hosted in India. Codecs such as the Tieline i-Mix G3 have been used since 2004 at the Olympic Games for live sports broadcasting. These codecs also have the ability to send audio over wireless IP, i.e. 3G and WiFi, as well as other audio transports like POTS, ISDN, satellite and X.21, and have been used at UEFA and FIFA World Cup tournaments.

Ultra-portable audio-over-IP codecs are also available as smartphone applications to send high-fidelity broadcast-quality audio from remote sites to studios. Applications such as Report-IT Live for iPhone can send bidirectional 15 kHz quality audio live with automated jitter buffering, forward error correction and error concealment. They can also send 20 kHz quality audio recordings from the phone to a studio via FTP.

Audio over IP is also used in scientific applications, such as the Neumayer Station in Antarctica, where Barix IP Audio encoders digitize and stream the complete audio spectrum captured by hydrophones underwater to the Alfred Wegener Institute for Polar and Marine Research in Germany.

== See also ==
- Comparison of audio network protocols
