= Node (computer networking) =

Device or point within a network capable of creating, receiving, or transmitting data

In networking, a node (Latin: nodus, 'knot') is either a redistribution point or a communication endpoint within telecommunication networks or computer networks.

A physical network node is an electronic device that is attached to a network, and is capable of creating, receiving, or transmitting information over a communication channel. In data communication, a physical network node may either be data communication equipment (such as a modem, hub, bridge or switch) or data terminal equipment (such as a digital telephone handset, a printer or a host computer).

A passive distribution point, such as a distribution frame or patch panel is not considered to be a node.

== Computer networks ==
In data communication, a physical network node may either be data communication equipment (DCE) such as a modem, hub, bridge or switch; or data terminal equipment (DTE) such as a digital telephone handset, a printer or a host computer.

If a network is a local area network (LAN) or wide area network (WAN), every LAN or WAN node that participates on the data link layer must have a network address, typically one for each network interface controller it possesses. Examples are computers, a DSL modem with Ethernet interface and wireless access point. Equipment, such as an Ethernet hub or modem with serial interface, that operates only below the data link layer does not require a network address.

If the network in question is the Internet or an intranet, many physical network nodes are host computers, also known as Internet nodes, identified by an IP address, and all hosts are physical network nodes. However, some data-link-layer devices such as switches, bridges and wireless access points do not have an IP host address (except sometimes for administrative purposes), and are not considered to be Internet nodes or hosts, but are considered physical network nodes and LAN nodes.

== Telecommunications ==
In the fixed telephone network, a node may be a public or private telephone exchange, a remote concentrator or a computer providing some intelligent network service. In cellular communication, switching points and databases such as the base station controller, home location register, gateway GPRS Support Node (GGSN) and serving GPRS support node (SGSN) are examples of nodes. Cellular network base stations are not considered to be nodes in this context.

In cable television systems (CATV), this term has assumed a broader context and is generally associated with a fiber optic node. This can be defined as those homes or businesses within a specific geographic area that are served from a common fiber optic receiver. A fiber optic node is generally described in terms of the number of homes passed that are served by that specific fiber node.

== Distributed systems ==
In a distributed system network, the nodes are clients, servers or peers. A peer may sometimes serve as client, sometimes server. In a peer-to-peer or overlay network, nodes that actively route data for the other networked devices as well as themselves are called supernodes.

Distributed systems may sometimes use virtual nodes so that the system is not oblivious to the heterogeneity of the nodes. This issue is addressed with special algorithms, like consistent hashing, as it is the case in Amazon's Dynamo.

Within a vast computer network, the individual computers on the periphery of the network, those that do not also connect other networks, and those that often connect transiently to one or more clouds are called end nodes. Typically, within the cloud computing construct, the individual user or customer computer that connects into one well-managed cloud is called an end node. Since these computers are a part of the network yet unmanaged by the cloud's host, they present significant risks to the entire cloud. This is called the end node problem. There are several means to remedy this problem but all require instilling trust in the end node computer.

== See also ==
- End system
- Middlebox
- Networking hardware
- Terminal (telecommunication)
