= X28 =

X28 may refer to:

- X.28, a telecommunications standard
- X28 (New York City bus)
- Pereira X-28A Sea Skimmer, an American flying boat
