= XOT =

Routing Protocol

XOT (X.25 Over TCP) is a protocol developed by Cisco Systems that enables X.25 packets to be encapsulated and routed through TCP/IP connections instead of LAPB links. In 2012, X.25 tunnelled over TCP/IP using XOT was noted as by then being likely more common in actual use than physical X.25 over LAPB.
