= X29 =

X29 may refer to:

- X.29, a telecommunications standard
- X29 (New York City bus)
- Grumman X-29, an American experimental airplane
- X29, a bus route in Wales run by Lloyds Coaches
- X29, a bus route from Southend in England run by Eastern National Omnibus Company
- X29, a diesel locomotive of the Tasmanian Government Railways X class
