= Synchronous virtual pipe =

When realizing pipeline forwarding a predefined schedule for forwarding a pre-allocated amount of bytes during one or more time frames along a path of subsequent switches establishes a synchronous virtual pipe (SVP). The SVP capacity is determined by the total number of bits allocated in every time cycle for the SVP. For example, for a 10 ms time cycle, if 20,000 bits are allocated during each of 2 time frames, the SVP capacity is 4 Mbit/s.

Pipeline forwarding guarantees that reserved traffic, i.e., traveling on an SVP, experiences:

1. bounded end-to-end delay,
2. delay jitter lower than two TFs, and
3. no congestion and resulting losses.

Two implementations of the pipeline forwarding were proposed: time-driven switching (TDS) and time-driven priority (TDP) and can be used to create pipeline forwarding parallel network in the future Internet.
