= FRAD =

FRAD may refer to:

- Frame Relay assembler/disassembler
- Functional Requirements for Authority Data
- Republican Front for Democratic Change; see Jean-Marie Doré
- FRAD, postnominal for Fellow of the Royal Academy of Dance
