= Connection-Oriented Network Service =

Network layer protocol

Connection-Oriented Network Service (CONS) is a service provided by the Open Systems Interconnection (OSI) network layer that establishes a virtual circuit for data exchange. It is one of the two primary OSI network-layer services, the other being Connectionless-mode Network Service (CLNS). CONS was largely influenced by X.25, and is formalized in the ISO standards ISO 8208 and ISO 8878, but has been generalized and formalized, with adjustments to addressing, flow control, and error-handling mechanisms to conform to OSI standards.

== Protocols providing CONS ==
Some protocols that provide the CONS service:

- X.25, as specified in ITU-T Recommendation X.223 is a Public Data Network protocol that provides the Connection Oriented Network Service as described in ITU-T Recommendation X.213.
- Signalling Connection Control Part (SCCP), as specified in ITU-T Recommendation Q.711 is a Signaling System 7 protocol that provides the Connection Oriented Network Service as described in ITU-T Recommendation X.213.
- Service Specific Connection Oriented Protocol (SSCOP), as specified in ITU-T Recommendation Q.2110 is an Asynchronous Transfer Mode protocol that provides the Connection Oriented Network Service as described in ITU-T Recommendation X.213.
