= Fractional lambda switching =

Fractional lambda switching (FλS) leverages on time-driven switching (TDS) to realize sub-lambda switching in highly scalable dynamic optical networking, which requires minimum (possibly optical) buffers. Fractional lambda switching implies switching fractions of optical channels as opposed to whole lambda switching where whole optical channels are the switching unit. In this context, TDS has the same general objectives as optical burst switching and optical packet switching: realizing all-optical networks with high wavelength utilization. TDS operation is based on time frames (TFs) that can be viewed as virtual containers for multiple IP packets that are switched at every TDS switch based on and coordinated by the UTC (coordinated universal time) signal implementing pipeline forwarding. In the context of optical networks, synchronous virtual pipes SVPs typical of pipeline forwarding are called fractional lambda pipes (FλPs).

In FλS, likewise in TDS, all packets in the same time frame are switched in the same way. Consequently, header processing is not required, which results in low complexity (hence high scalability) and enables optical implementation. The TF is the basic SVP capacity allocation unit; hence, the allocation granularity depends on the number of TFs per time cycle. For example, with a 10 Gbit/s optical channel and 1000 TFs in each time cycle, the minimum FλP capacity (obtained by allocating one TF in every time cycle) is 10 Mbit/s.

Scheduling through a switching fabric is based on a pre-defined schedule, which enables the implementation of a simple controller. Moreover, low-complexity switching fabric architectures, such as Banyan, can be deployed notwithstanding their blocking features, thus further enhancing scalability. In fact, blocking can be avoided during schedule computation by avoiding conflicting input/output connections during the same TF. Several results show that (especially if multiple wavelength division multiplexing channels are deployed on optical links between fractional λ switches) high link utilization can be achieved with negligible blocking using a Banyan network without speedup.

Various aspects of the technology are covered by several patents issued by both the United States Patent and Trademark Office and the European Patent Office.
