= Connectionless-mode Network Service =

OSI network layer datagram service

Connectionless-mode Network Service (CLNS) or simply Connectionless Network Service is an OSI network layer datagram service that does not require a circuit to be established before data is transmitted, and routes messages to their destinations independently of any other messages. As such it is a "best-effort" rather than a "reliable" delivery service. CLNS is one of the two primary OSI network-layer services, the other being Connection-Oriented Network Service (CONS). CLNS is not an Internet service, but provides capabilities in an OSI network environment similar to those provided by the Internet protocol suite. The service is specified in ISO/IEC 8348, the OSI Network Service Definition (which also defines the connection-oriented service, CONS.)

== Connectionless-mode Network Protocol ==
Connectionless-mode Network Protocol (CLNP) is an OSI protocol deployment. CLNS is the service provided by the Connectionless-mode Network Protocol (CLNP). From August 1990 to April 1995 the NSFNET backbone supported CLNP in addition to TCP/IP. However, CLNP usage remained low compared to TCP/IP.

== Transport Protocol Class 4 (TP4) in conjunction with CLNS ==
CLNS is used by ISO Transport Protocol Class 4 (TP4), one of the five transport layer protocols in the OSI suite. TP4 offers error recovery, performs segmentation and reassembly, and supplies multiplexing and demultiplexing of data streams over a single virtual circuit. TP4 sequences PDUs and retransmits them or re-initiates the connection if an excessive number are unacknowledged. TP4 provides reliable transport service and functions with either connection-oriented or connectionless network service. TP4 is the most commonly used of all the OSI transport protocols and is similar to the Transmission Control Protocol (TCP) in the Internet protocol suite.

== Protocols providing CLNS ==
Several protocols provide the CLNS service:

- Connectionless-mode Network Protocol (CLNP), as specified in ITU-T Recommendation X.233.
- End System-to-Intermediate System (ES-IS), a routing exchange protocol for use in conjunction with the protocol for providing the CLNS (ISO 9542).
- Intermediate System-to-Intermediate System (IS-IS), an intradomain routing exchange protocol used in both the OSI and Internet environments (ISO/IEC 10589 and RFC 1142).
- Interdomain Routing Protocol (IDRP), the OSI equivalent of BGP.
- Signalling Connection Control Part (SCCP), as specified in ITU-T Recommendation Q.711 is a Signaling System 7 protocol.

== See also ==
- X.25 protocol suite, an OSI Connection Oriented Network Service (CONS)
