= X.121 =

ITU-T recommendation

X.121 is the ITU-T address format of the X.25 protocol suite used as part of call setup to establish a switched virtual circuit between public data networks (PDNs), connecting two network user addresses (NUAs). It consists of a maximum of fourteen binary-coded decimal digits and is sent over the Packet Layer Protocol (PLP) after the packet type identifier (PTI).

== Description ==
The address is made up of the international data number (IDN), which consists of two fields: the 4 digit data network identification code (DNIC) and the (up to) 10 digit national terminal number (NTN).

The DNIC has three digits to identify the country (one to identify a zone and two to identify the country within the zone) and one to identify the PDN (allowing only ten in each country). The NTN identifies the exact network device (DTE, data terminal equipment) in the packet-switched network (PSN) and is often provided as an NUA. There are no rules to the structure of the NTN.

IPv4 addresses can be mapped to X.121 as described in RFC 1236. The 14.0.0.0/8 block used to be reserved for X.121 use but was returned to IANA in 2008 to stave off IPv4 address exhaustion.

== See also ==
- Videotex
- X.75
