= X.25 =

Standard protocol suite for packet switched wide area network (WAN) communication

- Interface between Data Terminal Equipment (DTE) and Data Circuit-terminating Equipment (DCE) for terminals operating in the packet mode and connected to public data networks by dedicated circuit
- Status: In force
- Year started: 1976
- Latest version: (10/96); October 1996
- Organization: ITU-T
- Committee: Study Group VII
- Domain: networking
- Website: https://www.itu.int/rec/T-REC-X.25/

X.25 is an ITU-T standard protocol suite for packet-switched data communication in wide area networks (WAN). It was originally defined by the International Telegraph and Telephone Consultative Committee (CCITT, now ITU-T) in a series of drafts and finalized in a publication known as The Orange Book in 1976.

The protocol suite is designed as three conceptual layers, which correspond closely to the lower three layers of the seven-layer OSI Reference Model, although it was developed several years before the OSI model (1984). It also supports functionality not found in the OSI network layer. An X.25 WAN consists of packet-switching exchange (PSE) nodes as the networking hardware, and leased lines, plain old telephone service connections, or ISDN connections as physical links.

X.25 was popular with telecommunications companies for their public data networks from the late 1970s to 1990s, which provided worldwide coverage. It was also used in financial transaction systems, such as automated teller machines, and by the credit card payment industry. However, most users have since moved to the Internet Protocol Suite (TCP/IP). X.25 is still used, for example by the aviation industry.

== History ==
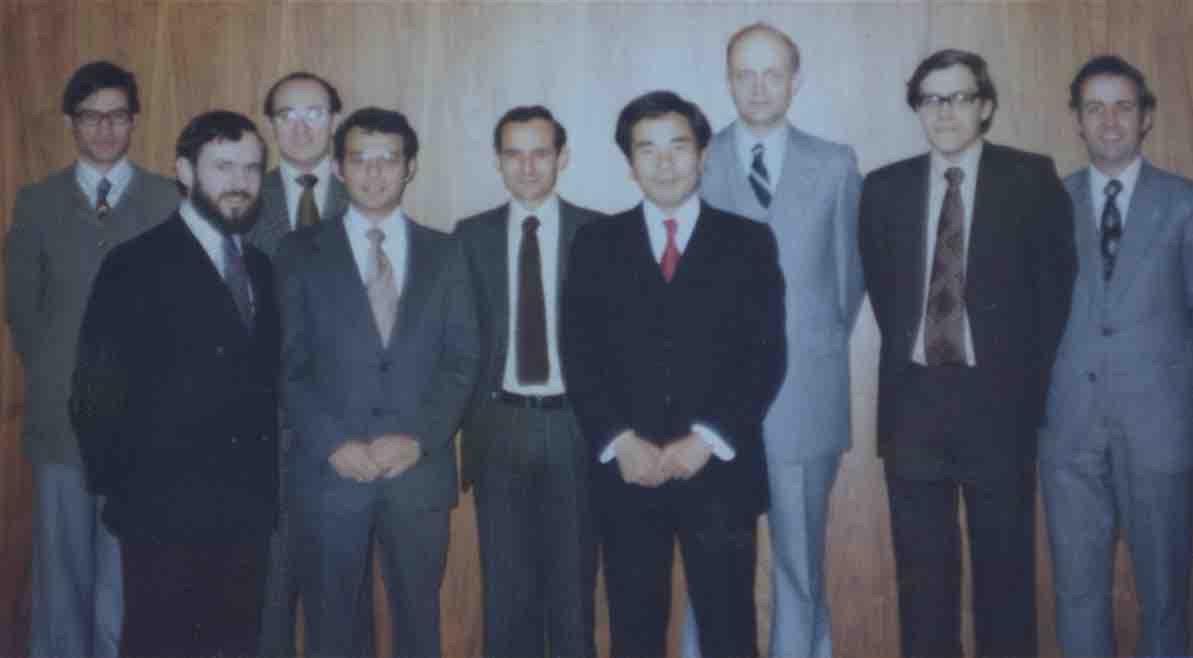
Representatives of PTTs and private companies who championed the development of X.25-based networks and services in Europe, North America and Japan. Photographed at the CCITT Rapporteur-group meeting of March 1975 in Ottawa, where they drafted the first X.25 proposal.

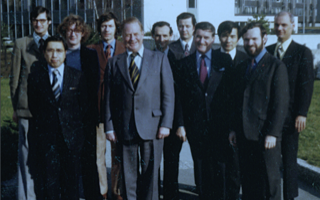
Major contributors to CCITT X.25, photographed just after its approval in March 1976.

The CCITT (later ITU-T), the organization responsible for international standardization of telecom services, began developing a standard for packet-switched data communication in the mid-1970s based on a number of emerging data network projects. Participants in the design of X.25 included engineers from Canada, France, Japan, the UK, and the USA representing a mix of national PTTs (France, Japan, UK) and private operators (Canada, USA). In particular, the work of Rémi Després, contributed significantly to the standard, which was based on a virtual circuit service. A few minor changes, which complemented the proposed specification, were accommodated to enable Larry Roberts to join the agreement. Various updates and additions were worked into the standard, eventually recorded in the ITU series of technical books describing the telecommunication systems. These books were published every fourth year with different-colored covers. The X.25 specification is part of the larger set of X-Series.

=== Standardization of virtual circuits by the CCITT ===
The CCITT appointed a special Rapporteur on packet switching, Halvor Bothner-By, who held an initial meeting in January 1974. This resulted in a question, to be answered by study group (SG) VII for the next CCITT plenary in 1976, which was “Should the packet-mode of operation be provided on public data networks and, if so, how should it be implemented?”. A list of packet switching networks “to be considered” was provided: ARPANET (of the ARPA in the USA), EIN (of the European COST), EPSS (of the British Post Office Telecommunications), RCP (of the French PTT), CYCLADES (of IRIA in France), the NPL network (of the NPL in the UK), the SWIFT network (of the international SWIFT society), and the SITA network (of the international SITA company).

The second Rapporteur meeting, hosted in Oslo by the Norwegian Telecommunications Administration in November 1974, gathered 24 participants, including representatives of other international organizations (ISO, IFIP, ECMA). A document submitted by France “with the active support of a number of European administrations” served as “main basis for discussion in this meeting”. It was then “agreed that two types of services should be considered, a ‘datagram’ service and a ‘virtual call’ service”.

At the third meeting, focus had moved from whether there should be packet-mode networks to whether there could be “a standard for the interface between the network and the computers”.

Starting in January 1975, several bilateral and multilateral meetings took place between network operators having commitments for a packet switching service, in view to draft a common interface specification. Meetings started between the Canadian DATAPAC and the French TRANSPAC, continued with the startup Telenet of the USA, and continued with the BPO of the UK.

In March 1975, Halvor Bothner-By produced a list of recommendations to be created, or simply updated, for a packet switching standard to become possible. It was used as a framework at a drafting meeting in Ottawa between engineers of the four operators wishing to have a standard as soon as possible in the USA, Canada, France, UK and Japan. They prepared contributions to be submitted to SG VII in their name by administrations having voting right in CCITT. One contribution was an X.2x interface specification, the first version of what would become X.25).

The fourth Rapporteur meeting, in May 1975 in Geneva, had 45 participants and 27 new documents. The Rapporteur asked whether packet switching recommendations should be issued "with a view to making international interworking possible”, "the French administration answered in the affirmative and Canada strongly supported the French proposal". No firm conclusion was however obtained yet.

The fifth Rapporteur meeting, in September 1975 in Geneva, had about 60 participants. After discussions on the proposed virtual circuit interface, numerous issues were left unresolved. Concerning datagrams, ‘It was proposed by Larry Roberts of the US delegation and supported by representatives from France and Canada respectively that the datagram classification be changed from “E” to “A”’, i.e., from essential "to be available internationally” to additional that "may be available in certain countries and internationally”. The Rapporteur's last report expressed doubts “that a standard would be ready for adoption by SG VII”.

At the last meeting of the full SG VII before the CCITT plenary of September 1976, the available draft X.25 raised numerous clarification questions and/or technical objections. SG VII's chairman Vern MacDonald appointed an editor and provided a meeting facility for the weekend. After intense work during it, all issues had been dealt with. For an approval by the full study group, a challenge remained: copies of the updated X.25 draft had to be available in two languages. To get them in due time, Tony Rybczynski of DATAPAC and Paul Guinaudeau of TRANSPAC spent a full night to handwrite all negotiated amendments, and to assemble them with paste and scissors into clean documents. COM VII then reviewed distributed copies, and unanimously approved them for submission to the forthcoming CCITT plenary. At this plenary of September 1976, the X.25 recommendation and the other 10 of SG VII were unanimously approved.

As requested by the USA, an optional datagram service was added to the revised X.25 of 1980, together with an alignment of its link layer, now called LAPB, with a recent evolution of HDLC in ISO. In the absence of any public network operator implementing this option, datagrams were finally deleted from X.25 in its update of 1984.

=== Worldwide public data networks ===
Publicly accessible X.25 networks, commonly called public data networks, were set up in many countries during the late 1970s and 1980s to lower the cost of accessing various online services. Examples include Iberpac, TRANSPAC, Compuserve, Tymnet, Telenet, Euronet, PSS, Datapac, Datanet 1 and AUSTPAC as well as the International Packet Switched Service. Their combined network had large global coverage during the 1980s and into the 1990s.

Beginning in the early 1990s, in North America, use of X.25 networks (predominated by Telenet and Tymnet) started to be replaced by Frame Relay services offered by national telephone companies. Most systems that required X.25 now use TCP/IP; however, it is possible to transport X.25 over TCP/IP when necessary.

X.25 networks are still in use throughout the world. A variant called AX.25 is used widely by amateur packet radio. Racal Paknet, now known as Widanet, remains in operation in many regions of the world, running on an X.25 protocol base. In some countries, like the Netherlands and Germany, it is possible to use a stripped version of X.25 via the D-channel of an ISDN-2 (or ISDN BRI) connection for low-volume applications such as point-of-sale terminals, but the future of this service in the Netherlands is uncertain.

X.25 is still used in the aeronautical business (especially in Asia) even though a transition to modern protocols is increasingly important as X.25 hardware becomes increasingly rare and costly. As recently as March 2006, the United States National Airspace Data Interchange Network has used X.25 to interconnect remote airfields with air route traffic control centers.

France was one of the last remaining countries where commercial end-user service based on X.25 operated. Known as Minitel it was based on Videotex, itself running on X.25. In 2002, Minitel had about 9 million users, and in 2011 it accounted for about 2 million users in France when France Télécom announced it would shut down the service by 30 June 2012. As planned, service was terminated 30 June 2012. There were 800,000 terminals in operation at the time. An X.25 service was still purchasable from BT in the United Kingdom in 2019.

== Architecture ==
The general concept of X.25 was to create a universal and global packet-switched network. Much of the X.25 system is a description of the rigorous error correction needed to achieve this, as well as more efficient sharing of capital-intensive physical resources.

The X.25 specification defines only the interface between a subscriber (DTE) and an X.25 network (DCE). X.75, a protocol very similar to X.25, defines the interface between two X.25 networks to allow connections to traverse two or more networks. X.25 does not specify how the network operates internally – many X.25 network implementations used something very similar to X.25 or X.75 internally, but others used quite different protocols internally. The ISO protocol equivalent to X.25, ISO 8208, is compatible with X.25, but additionally includes provision for two X.25 DTEs to be directly connected to each other with no network in between. By separating the Packet-Layer Protocol, ISO 8208 permits operation over additional networks such as ISO 8802 LLC2 (ISO LAN) and the OSI data link layer.

X.25 originally defined three basic protocol levels or architectural layers. In the original specifications these were referred to as levels and also had a level number, whereas all ITU-T X.25 recommendations and ISO 8208 standards released after 1984 refer to them as layers. The layer numbers were dropped to avoid confusion with the OSI Model layers.

- Physical layer: This layer specifies the physical, electrical, functional and procedural characteristics to control the physical link between a DTE and a DCE. Common implementations use X.21, EIA-232, EIA-449 or other serial protocols.
- Data link layer: The data link layer consists of the link access procedure for data interchange on the link between a DTE and a DCE. In its implementation, the Link Access Procedure, Balanced (LAPB) is a data link protocol that manages a communication session and controls the packet framing. It is a bit-oriented protocol that provides error correction and orderly delivery.
- Packet layer: This layer defined a packet-layer protocol for exchanging control and user data packets to form a packet-switching network based on virtual circuits, according to the Packet Layer Protocol.

The X.25 model was based on the traditional telephony concept of establishing reliable circuits through a shared network, but using software to create "virtual calls" through the network. These calls interconnect "data terminal equipment" (DTE) providing endpoints to users, which looked like point-to-point connections. Each endpoint can establish many separate virtual calls to different endpoints.

For a brief period, the specification also included a connectionless datagram service, but this was dropped in the next revision. The "fast select with restricted response facility" is intermediate between full call establishment and connectionless communication. It is widely used in query-response transaction applications involving a single request and response limited to 128 bytes of data carried each way. The data is carried in an extended call request packet and the response is carried in an extended field of the call reject packet, with a connection never being fully established.

Closely related to the X.25 protocol are the protocols to connect asynchronous devices (such as dumb terminals and printers) to an X.25 network: X.3, X.28 and X.29. This functionality was performed using a packet assembler/disassembler or PAD (also known as a triple-X device, referring to the three protocols used).

=== Relation to the OSI Reference Model ===
Although X.25 predates the OSI Reference Model (OSIRM), the physical layer of the OSI model corresponds to the X.25 physical layer, the data link layer to the X.25 data link layer, and the network layer to the X.25 packet layer. The X.25 data link layer, LAPB, provides a reliable data path across a data link (or multiple parallel data links, multilink) which may not be reliable itself. The X.25 packet layer provides the virtual call mechanisms, running over X.25 LAPB. The packet layer includes mechanisms to maintain virtual calls and to signal data errors in the event that the data link layer cannot recover from data transmission errors. All but the earliest versions of X.25 include facilities which provide for OSI network layer Addressing (NSAP addressing, see below).

=== User device support ===
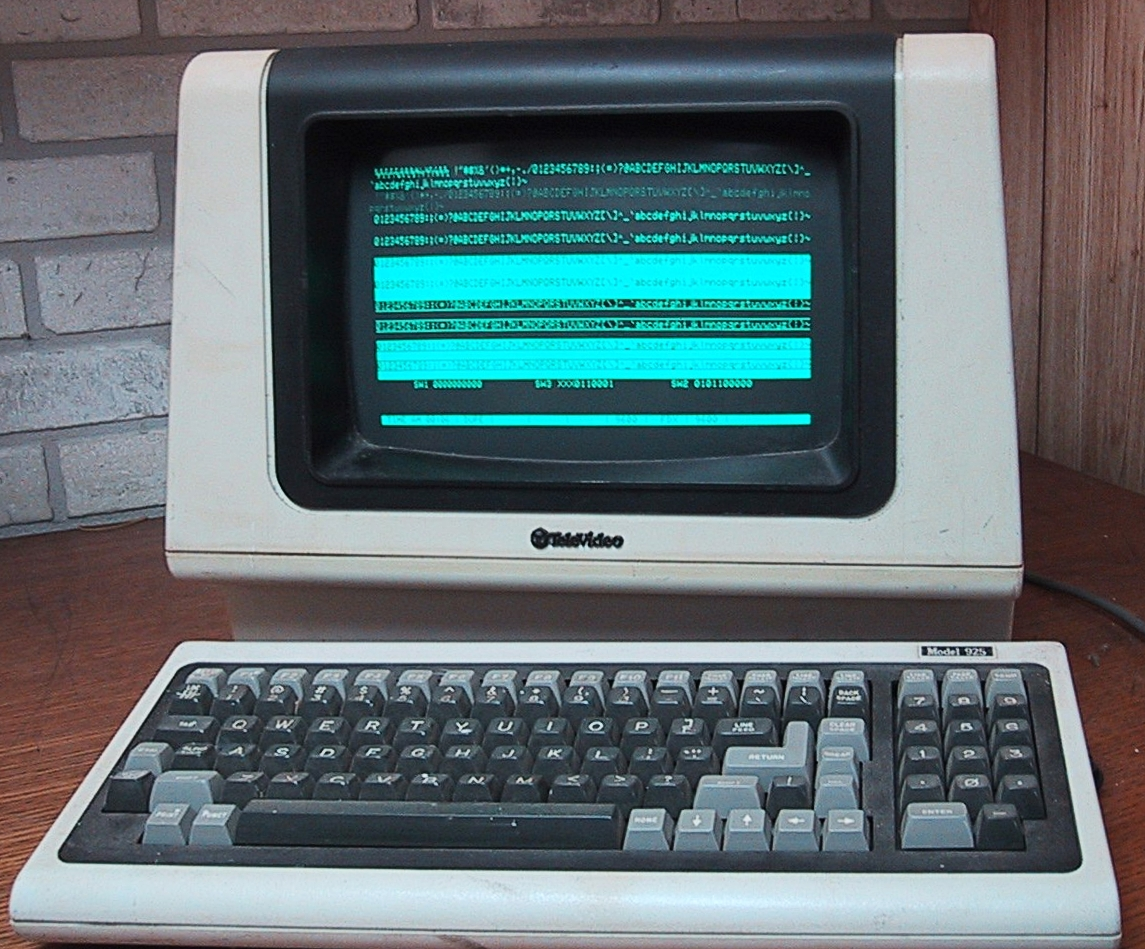
A Televideo terminal model 925 made around 1982

X.25 was developed in the era of computer terminals connecting to host computers, although it also can be used for communications between computers. Instead of dialing directly “into” the host computer – which would require the host to have its own pool of modems and phone lines, and require non-local callers to make long-distance calls – the host could have an X.25 connection to a network service provider. Now dumb-terminal users could dial into the network's local “PAD” (packet assembly/disassembly facility), a gateway device connecting modems and serial lines to the X.25 link as defined by the X.29 and X.3 standards.

Having connected to the PAD, the dumb-terminal user tells the PAD which host to connect to, by giving a phone-number-like address in the X.121 address format (or by giving a host name, if the service provider allows for names that map to X.121 addresses). The PAD then places an X.25 call to the host, establishing a virtual call. Note that X.25 provides for virtual calls, so appears to be a circuit switched network, even though in fact the data itself is packet switched internally, similar to the way TCP provides connections even though the underlying data is packet switched. Two X.25 hosts could, of course, call one another directly; no PAD is involved in this case. In theory, it doesn't matter whether the X.25 caller and X.25 destination are both connected to the same carrier, but in practice it was not always possible to make calls from one carrier to another.

For the purpose of flow-control, a sliding window protocol is used with the default window size of 2. The acknowledgements may have either local or end to end significance. A D bit (Data Delivery bit) in each data packet indicates if the sender requires end to end acknowledgement. When D=1, it means that the acknowledgement has end to end significance and must take place only after the remote DTE has acknowledged receipt of the data. When D=0, the network is permitted (but not required) to acknowledge before the remote DTE has acknowledged or even received the data.

While the PAD function defined by X.28 and X.29 specifically supported asynchronous character terminals, PAD equivalents were developed to support a wide range of proprietary intelligent communications devices, such as those for IBM System Network Architecture (SNA).

=== Error control ===
Error recovery procedures at the packet layer assume that the data link layer is responsible for retransmitting data received in error. Packet layer error handling focuses on resynchronizing the information flow in calls, as well as clearing calls that have gone into unrecoverable states:

- Level 3 Reset packets, which re-initializes the flow on a virtual call (but does not break the virtual call).
- Restart packet, which clears down all virtual calls on the data link and resets all permanent virtual circuits on the data link.

== Addressing and virtual circuits ==
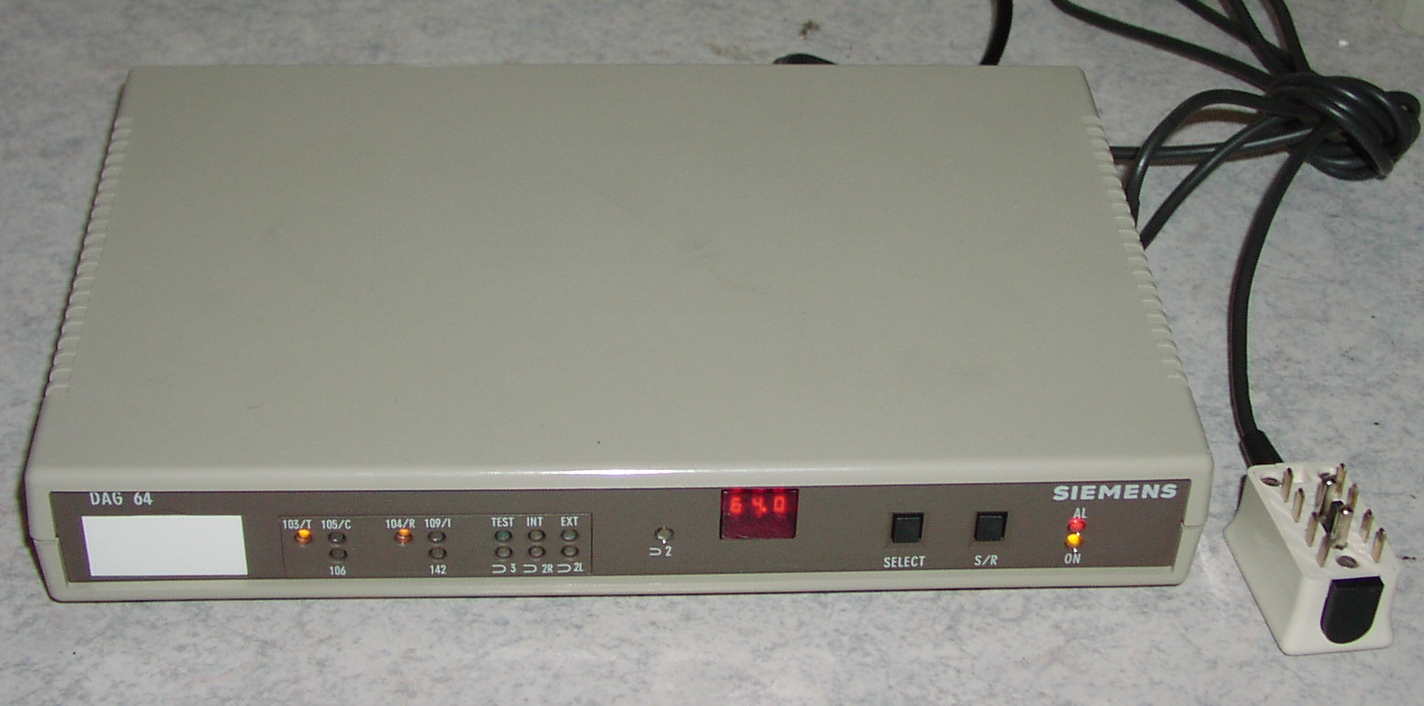
An X.25 modem once used to connect to the German Datex-P network

X.25 supports two types of virtual circuits; virtual calls (VC) and permanent virtual circuits (PVC). Virtual calls are established on an as-needed basis. For example, a VC is established when a call is placed and torn down after the call is complete. VCs are established through a call establishment and clearing procedure. On the other hand, permanent virtual circuits are preconfigured into the network. PVCs are seldom torn down and thus provide a dedicated connection between end points.

VC may be established using X.121 addresses. The X.121 address consists of a three-digit data country code (DCC) plus a network digit, together forming the four-digit data network identification code (DNIC), followed by the national terminal number (NTN) of at most ten digits. Note the use of a single network digit, seemingly allowing for only 10 network carriers per country, but some countries are assigned more than one DCC to avoid this limitation. Networks often used fewer than the full NTN digits for routing, and made the spare digits available to the subscriber (sometimes called the sub-address) where they could be used to identify applications or for further routing on the subscribers networks.

NSAP addressing facility was added in the X.25 (1984) revision of the specification, and this enabled X.25 to better meet the requirements of OSI Connection Oriented Network Service (CONS). Public X.25 networks were not required to make use of NSAP addressing, but, to support OSI CONS, were required to carry the NSAP addresses and other ITU-T specified DTE facilities transparently from DTE to DTE. Later revisions allowed multiple addresses in addition to X.121 addresses to be carried on the same DTE-DCE interface: Telex addressing (F.69), PSTN addressing (E.163), ISDN addressing (E.164), Internet Protocol addresses (IANA ICP), and local IEEE 802.2 MAC addresses.

PVCs are permanently established in the network and therefore do not require the use of addresses for call setup. PVCs are identified at the subscriber interface by their logical channel identifier (see below). However, in practice not many of the national X.25 networks supported PVCs.

One DTE-DCE interface to an X.25 network has a maximum of 4095 logical channels on which it is allowed to establish virtual calls and permanent virtual circuits, although networks are not expected to support a full 4095 virtual circuits. For identifying the channel to which a packet is associated, each packet contains a 12 bit logical channel identifier made up of an 8-bit logical channel number and a 4-bit logical channel group number. Logical channel identifiers remain assigned to a virtual circuit for the duration of the connection. Logical channel identifiers identify a specific logical channel between the DTE (subscriber appliance) and the DCE (network), and only has local significance on the link between the subscriber and the network. The other end of the connection at the remote DTE is likely to have assigned a different logical channel identifier. The range of possible logical channels is split into 4 groups: channels assigned to permanent virtual circuits, assigned to incoming virtual calls, two-way (incoming or outgoing) virtual calls, and outgoing virtual calls. (Directions refer to the direction of virtual call initiation as viewed by the DTE – they all carry data in both directions.) The ranges allowed a subscriber to be configured to handle significantly differing numbers of calls in each direction while reserving some channels for calls in one direction. All international networks are required to implement support for permanent virtual circuits, two-way logical channels and one-way logical channels outgoing; one-way logical channels incoming is an additional optional facility. DTE-DCE interfaces are not required to support more than one logical channel. Logical channel identifier zero will not be assigned to a permanent virtual circuit or virtual call. The logical channel identifier of zero is used for packets which don't relate to a specific virtual circuit (e.g. packet layer restart, registration, and diagnostic packets).

== Billing ==
In public networks, X.25 was typically billed as a flat monthly service fee depending on link speed, and then a price-per-segment on top of this. Link speeds varied, typically from 2400 bit/s up to 2 Mbit/s, although speeds above 64 kbit/s were uncommon in the public networks. A segment was 64 bytes of data (rounded up, with no carry-over between packets), charged to the caller (or callee in the case of reverse charged calls, where supported). Calls invoking the Fast Select facility (allowing 128 bytes of data in call request, call confirmation and call clearing phases) would generally attract an extra charge, as might use of some of the other X.25 facilities. PVCs would have a monthly rental charge and a lower price-per-segment than VCs, making them cheaper only where large volumes of data are passed.

== X.25 packet types ==
Packet Type	DCE → DTE	DTE → DCE	VC	PVC
Call setup and clearing	Incoming call	Call request	X	
	Call connected	Call accepted	X	
	Clear indication	Clear request	X	
	DCE clear confirmation	DTE clear confirmation	X	
Data and interrupt	DCE data	DTE data	X	X
	DCE interrupt	DTE interrupt	X	X
	DCE interrupt confirmation	DTE interrupt confirmation	X	X
Flow control and reset	DCE RR (Receive Ready)	DTE RR (Receive Ready)	X	X
	DCE RNR (Receive Not Ready)	DTE RNR (Receive Not Ready)	X	X
	DCE REJ (Reject)	DTE REJ (Reject)	X	X
	Reset indication	Reset request	X	X
	DCE reset confirmation	DTE reset confirmation	X	X
Restart	Restart indication	Restart request	X	X
	DCE restart confirmation	DTE restart confirmation	X	X
Diagnostic	Diagnostic		X	X

== X.25 details ==
The network may allow the selection of the maximal length in range 16 to 4096 octets (2^{n} values only) per virtual circuit by negotiation as part of the call setup procedure. The maximal length may be different at the two ends of the virtual circuit.

- Data terminal equipment constructs control packets which are encapsulated into data packets. The packets are sent to the data circuit-terminating equipment, using LAPB Protocol.
- Data circuit-terminating equipment strips the layer-2 headers in order to encapsulate packets to the internal network protocol.

=== X.25 facilities ===
X.25 provides a set of user facilities defined and described in ITU-T Recommendation X.2. The X.2 user facilities fall into five categories:

- Essential facilities;
- Additional facilities;
- Conditional facilities;
- Mandatory facilities; and,
- Optional facilities.

X.25 also provides X.25 and ITU-T specified DTE optional user facilities defined and described in ITU-T Recommendation X.7. The X.7 optional user facilities fall into four categories of user facilities that require:

- Subscription only;
- Subscription followed by dynamic invocation;
- Subscription or dynamic invocation; and,
- Dynamic invocation only.

=== X.25 protocol versions ===
The CCITT/ITU-T versions of the protocol specifications are for public data networks (PDN). The ISO/IEC versions address additional features for private networks (e.g. local area networks (LAN) use) while maintaining compatibility with the CCITT/ITU-T specifications.

The user facilities and other features supported by each version of X.25 and ISO/IEC 8208 have varied from edition to edition. Several major protocol versions of X.25 exist:

- CCITT Recommendation X.25 (1976) Orange Book
- CCITT Recommendation X.25 (1980) Yellow Book
- CCITT Recommendation X.25 (1984) Red Book
- CCITT Recommendation X.25 (1988) Blue Book
- ITU-T Recommendation X.25 (1993) White Book
- ITU-T Recommendation X.25 (1996) Grey Book

The X.25 Recommendation allows many options for each network to choose when deciding which features to support and how certain operations are performed. This means each network needs to publish its own document giving the specification of its X.25 implementation, and most networks required DTE appliance manufacturers to undertake protocol conformance testing, which included testing for strict adherence and enforcement of their network specific options. (Network operators were particularly concerned about the possibility of a badly behaving or misconfigured DTE appliance taking out parts of the network and affecting other subscribers.) Therefore, subscriber's DTE appliances have to be configured to match the specification of the particular network to which they are connecting. Most of these were sufficiently different to prevent interworking if the subscriber didn't configure their appliance correctly or the appliance manufacturer didn't include specific support for that network. In spite of protocol conformance testing, this often led to interworking problems when initially attaching an appliance to a network.

In addition to the CCITT/ITU-T versions of the protocol, four editions of ISO/IEC 8208 exist:

- ISO/IEC 8208:1987, First Edition, compatible with X.25 (1980) and (1984)
- ISO/IEC 8208:1990, Second Edition, compatible with 1st Ed. and X.25 (1988)
- ISO/IEC 8208:1995, Third Edition, compatible with 2nd Ed. and X.25 (1993)
- ISO/IEC 8208:2000, Fourth Edition, compatible with 3rd Ed. and X.25 (1996)

== Legacy ==
The X.25 protocol included error-control overhead to handle data loss, since circuits back then ran over poor-grade cabling and had a lot of single-bit errors to deal with. As circuits became more and more reliable, the overhead was no longer needed, and less expensive Frame Relay took over. Frame Relay has its technical base in X.25, but does not attempt to correct errors.

The worldwide public data networks based on X.25 helped support the growth of IP networks running over X.25.

X.25 was also available in niche applications such as Retronet that allow vintage computers to use the Internet.

== See also ==
- History of the Internet
- OSI protocol suite
- Packet switched networks – are networks, including X.25, that have protocols using "packets"
- Protocol Wars
- XOT – is an "X.25 Over TCP" protocol, i.e. with X.25 encapsulation on TCP/IP networks
- X.PC
- AX.25
