= Virtual circuit =

Emulation a dedicated physical link over a packet-switched network

A virtual circuit (VC) is a means of transporting data over a data network, based on packet switching and in which a connection is first established across the network between two endpoints. The network, rather than having a fixed data rate reservation per connection as in circuit switching, takes advantage of the statistical multiplexing on its transmission links, an intrinsic feature of packet switching.

The 1978 X.25 standardization of virtual circuits imposes per-connection flow controls at all user-to-network and network-to-network interfaces. This permits participation in congestion control and reduces the likelihood of packet loss in a heavily loaded network. Some circuit protocols provide reliable communication service through the use of data retransmissions invoked by error detection and automatic repeat request (ARQ).

Before a virtual circuit may be used, it must be established between network nodes in the call setup phase. Once established, a bit stream or byte stream may be exchanged between the nodes, providing abstraction from low-level division into protocol data units, and enabling higher-level protocols to operate transparently.

An alternative to virtual-circuit networks is datagram networks.

== History ==
Paul Baran introduced the concept of virtual circuits in 1962. The ARPANET was what would come to be called a virtual circuit network, with the constraint that, for each connection, only one message may be in transit in the network, so that the sequential order of messages is preserved end-to-end. In the early 1970s, the British Post Office developed the concept of "virtual calls" for its experimental EPSS network but the protocols were complex and limited. Rémi Després formalized the concept of virtual circuits and validated it on the French RCP experimental network with his team at CNET. He and others submitted the X.25 Recommendation to the CCITT (now ITU-T), which became the standard communication protocol of worldwide public data networks in the 1970s–80s.

== Comparison with circuit switching ==
Virtual circuit communication resembles circuit switching, since both are connection oriented, meaning that in both cases data is delivered in correct order, and signaling overhead is required during a connection establishment phase. However, circuit switching provides a constant bit rate and latency, while these may vary in a virtual circuit service due to factors such as:

- varying packet queue lengths in the network nodes,
- varying bit rate generated by the application,
- varying load from other users sharing the same network resources by means of statistical multiplexing, etc.

== Virtual call capability ==
In telecommunications, a virtual call capability, sometimes called a virtual call facility, is a service feature in which:

- a call set-up procedure and a call disengagement procedure determine the period of communication between two DTEs in which user data are transferred by a packet switched network
- end-to-end transfer control of packets within the network is required
- data may be delivered to the network by the call originator before the call access phase is completed, but the data are not delivered to the call receiver if the call attempt is unsuccessful
- the network delivers all the user data to the call receiver in the same sequence in which the data are received by the network
- multi-access DTEs may have several virtual calls in progress at the same time.

An alternative approach to virtual calls is connectionless communication using datagrams.

In the early 1970s, virtual call capability was developed by British Telecom for EPSS (building on the work of Donald Davies at the National Physical Laboratory). The concept was enhanced by Rémi Després as virtual circuits for the RCP experimental network of the French PTT.

== Layer 4 virtual circuits ==
Connection oriented transport layer protocols such as TCP may rely on a connectionless packet switching network layer protocol such as IP, where different packets may be routed over different paths, and thus be delivered out of order. However, it is possible to use TCP as a virtual circuit, since TCP includes segment numbering that allows reordering on the receiver side to accommodate out-of-order delivery.

== Layer 2/3 virtual circuits ==
Data link layer and network layer virtual circuit protocols are based on connection-oriented packet switching, meaning that data is always delivered along the same network path, i.e., through the same nodes. Advantages of this over connectionless packet switching are:

- Bandwidth reservation during the connection establishment phase is supported, making guaranteed quality of service (QoS) possible. For example, a constant bit rate QoS class may be provided, resulting in emulation of circuit switching.
- Less overhead is required since the packets are not routed individually and complete addressing information is not provided in the header of each data packet. Only a small virtual channel identifier (VCI) is required in each packet. Routing information is only transferred to the network nodes during the connection establishment phase.
- The network nodes are faster and have higher capacity in theory since they are switches that only perform routing during the connection establishment phase, while connectionless network nodes are routers that perform routing for each packet individually. Switching only involves looking up the virtual channel identifier in a table rather than analyzing a complete address. Switches can easily be implemented in ASIC hardware, while routing is more complex and requires software implementation. However, because of the large market of IP routers, and because advanced IP routers support layer 3 switching, modern IP routers may today be faster than switches for connection-oriented protocols.

== Example protocols ==
Examples of transport layer protocols that provide a virtual circuit:

- Transmission Control Protocol (TCP), where a reliable virtual circuit is established on top of the underlying unreliable and connectionless IP protocol. The virtual circuit is identified by the source and destination network socket address pair, i.e., the sender and receiver IP address and port number. Guaranteed QoS is not provided.
- Stream Control Transmission Protocol (SCTP), where a virtual circuit is established on top of the IP protocol.

Examples of network-layer and data-link-layer virtual circuit protocols, where data is always delivered over the same path:

- X.25, where the VC is identified by a virtual channel identifier (VCI). X.25 provides reliable node-to-node communication and guaranteed QoS.
- Frame Relay, where the VC is identified by a DLCI. Frame Relay is unreliable, but may provide guaranteed QoS.
- Asynchronous Transfer Mode (ATM), where the circuit is identified by a virtual path identifier (VPI) and virtual channel identifier (VCI) pair. The ATM layer provides unreliable virtual circuits, but the ATM protocol provides for reliability through the ATM adaptation layer (AAL) Service Specific Convergence Sublayer (SSCS) (though it uses the terms assured and non-assured rather than reliable and unreliable).
- General Packet Radio Service (GPRS)
- Multiprotocol Label Switching (MPLS), which can be used for IP over virtual circuits. Each circuit is identified by a label. MPLS is unreliable but provides eight different QoS classes.

== Permanent and switched virtual circuits in ATM, Frame Relay, and X.25 ==
Switched virtual circuits (SVCs) are generally set up on a per-call basis and are disconnected when the call is terminated; however, a permanent virtual circuit (PVC) can be established as an option to provide a dedicated circuit link between two facilities. PVC configuration is usually preconfigured by the service provider. Unlike SVCs, PVCs are seldom intentionally disconnected.

A switched virtual circuit (SVC) is a virtual circuit that is dynamically established on demand and is torn down when transmission is complete, for example, after a phone call or a file download. SVCs are used in situations where data transmission is sporadic and/or not always between the same data terminal equipment (DTE) endpoints.

A permanent virtual circuit (PVC) is a virtual circuit established for repeated/continuous use between the same DTE. In a PVC, the long-term association is identical to the data transfer phase of a virtual call. Permanent virtual circuits eliminate the need for repeated call set-up and clearing.

- Frame Relay is typically used to provide PVCs.
- ATM provides both switched virtual connections and permanent virtual connections, as they are called in ATM terminology.
- X.25 provides both virtual calls and PVCs, although not all X.25 service providers or DTE implementations support PVCs, as their use was much less common than SVCs

== See also ==
- Data link connection identifier (DLCI)
- Label switching
- Protocol Wars
- Traffic flow (computer networking)
