= Time-driven priority =

Scheduling technique in computing

Time-driven priority (TDP) is a synchronous packet scheduling technique that implements UTC-based pipeline forwarding and can be combined with conventional IP routing to achieve greater flexibility than other pipeline forwarding implementation such as time-driven switching (TDS) or fractional lambda switching (FλS).. Packets entering a switch from the same input port during the same [time frame] (TF) can be sent out from different output ports, according to the rules that drive IP packet routing. Operation in accordance to pipeline forwarding principles ensures deterministic quality of service and low complexity packet scheduling. Specifically, packets scheduled for transmission during a TF are given maximum priority; if resources have been properly reserved, all scheduled packets will be at the output port and transmitted before their TF ends.

Various aspects of the technology are covered by several patents issued by both the United States Patent and Trademark Office and the European Patent Office.
