= X.28 =

X.28 is an ITU-T standard specifying the interface between asynchronous character-mode data terminal equipment (DTE), such as computer terminals, and a Packet Assembler/Disassembler (PAD) that connects the DTE to a packet switched network such as an X.25 network.
