= Remote Database Access =

Protocol standard for database access

Remote database access (RDA) is a protocol standard for database access produced in 1993 by the International Organization for Standardization (ISO). Despite early efforts to develop proof of concept implementations of RDA for major commercial relational database management systems (RDBMSs) (including Oracle, Rdb, NonStop SQL and Teradata), this standard has not found commercial support from database vendors. The standard has since been withdrawn, and replaced by ISO/IEC 9579:1999 - Information technology -- Remote Database Access for SQL, which has also been withdrawn, and replaced by ISO/IEC 9579:2000 Information technology -- Remote database access for SQL with security enhancement.

== Purpose ==
The purpose of RDA is to describe the connection of a database client to a database server. It includes features for:

- communicating database operations and parameters from the client to the server,
- in return, transporting result data from the server to the client,
- database transaction management, and
- exchange of information.

RDA is an application-level protocol, inasmuch that it builds on an existing network connection between client and server. In the case of TCP/IP connections, RFC 1066 is used for implementing RDA.

== History ==
RDA was published in 1993 as a combined standard of ANSI, ISO (International Organization for Standardization) and IEC (International Electrotechnical Commission). The standards definition comprises two parts:

- ANSI/ISO/IEC 9579-1:1993 - Remote Database Access -- Part 1: Generic Model, Service and Protocol
- ANSI/ISO/IEC 9579-2:1993

== Sources ==
- "Remote Database Access". NIST SQL Project. National Institute of Standards and Technology. Archived from the original on 2016-03-03.
