= Packet assembler/disassembler =

A packet assembler/disassembler, abbreviated PAD is a communications device which provides multiple asynchronous terminal connectivity to an X.25 (packet-switching) network or host computer. It collects data from a group of terminals and places the data into X.25 packets (assembly). A PAD also does the reverse, it takes data packets from packet-switching network or host computer and returns them into a character stream that can be sent to the terminals (disassembly). A Frame Relay assembler/disassembler (FRAD) is a similar device for accessing Frame Relay networks.

== ITU-T (Triple-X PAD) ==
The structure of a PAD is defined by the ITU-T in recommendations X.3, X.28, and X.29. Sometimes, this is referred to as a Triple-X PAD, due to the three X-series recommendations which define it:

- X.3 specifies the parameters for terminal-handling functions such as line speed, flow control, character echo, et al. for a connection to an X.25 host. The X.3 parameters are similar in function to present-day Telnet options.
- X.28 defines the DTE-C (asynchronous character mode) interface to a PAD, including the commands for making and clearing down connections, and manipulating the X.3 parameters. The commands were very crude, a bit like (but not at all compatible with) the Hayes command set. Many commercial PAD products provided completely different enhanced user interfaces.
- X.29 defines the DTE-P (packet mode) interface to a PAD, i.e., how the PAD encapsulates characters and control information in X.25 packets.

Connections are established using X.121 14-digit X.25 addresses.

== Green Book PAD ==
One of the UK Coloured Book protocols, Green Book, also defines two PAD protocols. Green Book was developed by (UK) Post Office Telecommunications in the 1970s. Although not identical to Triple-X, Green Book is sufficiently similar to X.3 and X.29 that generally the two will interwork. Green Book also specifies TS29, a very similar protocol which ran over the Yellow Book Transport Service, which is another of the Coloured Book protocols.

== ITP ==
ITP (Interactive Terminal Protocol) was an early PAD protocol for use over X.25 developed in the 1970s for use with UK GPO's EPSS (Experimental Packet Switching System, the predecessor of PSS). ITP predated Triple-X, and is a completely different protocol. Science and Engineering Research Council (SERC) also used ITP on SERCnet and continued developing ITP after EPSS, although it eventually gave way to Triple-X.

== See also ==
- Terminal node controller
