= Connectionless communication =

Network protocol with routing per packet

Connectionless communication, often referred to as CL-mode communication, is a data transmission method used in packet switching networks, using data packets that are frequently called datagrams, in which each data packet is individually addressed and routed based on information carried in each packet, rather than in the setup information of a prearranged, fixed data channel as in connection-oriented communication. Connectionless protocols are usually described as stateless protocols; the Internet Protocol (IP) and User Datagram Protocol (UDP) are examples.

== Attributes ==
Under connectionless communication between two network endpoints, a message can be sent from one endpoint to another without prior arrangement. The device at one end of the communication transmits data addressed to the other, without first ensuring that the recipient is available and ready to receive the data. Some protocols allow for error correction by requesting retransmission.

Connectionless protocols are stateless protocols because the endpoints have no protocol-defined way to remember where they are in a "conversation" of message exchanges. It has lower overhead than connection-oriented communication because, in connection-oriented communication, the communicating peers must first establish a logical or physical data channel or connection in a dialog preceding the exchange of user data. It allows for multicast and broadcast operations in which the same data are transmitted to several recipients in a single transmission.

In connectionless transmissions, the service provider usually cannot guarantee that there will be no loss, error insertion, misdelivery, duplication, or out-of-sequence delivery of the packet. However, the effect of errors may be reduced by implementing error correction within an application protocol.

In connectionless mode, there is less opportunity for optimization when sending several data units between the same two peers. By establishing a connection at the beginning of such a data exchange the components (routers, bridges) along the network path would be able to pre-compute (and hence cache) routing-related information, avoiding re-computation for every packet. In connection-oriented communication, network components can also reserve capacity for the transfer of the subsequent data units of a video download, for example.

== Architecture and implementations ==
Distinction between connectionless and connection-oriented transmission may take place at several layers of the OSI Reference Model:

- Transport layer: TCP is a connection-oriented transport protocol. UDP is connectionless.
- Network layer.
- Data link layer: The IEEE 802.2 protocol at the Logical Link Control sublayer of the data link layer may provide both connectionless and connection-oriented services. In fact, some network protocols (such as SNA's Path Control in its early stages) require a connection-oriented data link layer. Others (like IP) do not. (After the appearance of APPN, SNA could operate on a connectionless data link service as well.)

Notable connectionless protocols are: Internet Protocol (IP), User Datagram Protocol (UDP), Internet Control Message Protocol (ICMP), Internetwork Packet Exchange (IPX), Transparent Inter-process Communication, NetBIOS, and Fast and Secure Protocol (FASP).
