= Frame Relay assembler/disassembler =

A FRAD (Frame Relay access device or Frame Relay assembler/disassembler) is a device that turns data packets into Frame Relay frames that can be sent over a Frame Relay network and turns the received Frame Relay frames into data packets. Its assembly and disassembly functionality is similar to a packet assembler/disassembler (PAD), which is used for accessing X.25 networks.
