= X.21 =

ITU-T telecommunications interface specification

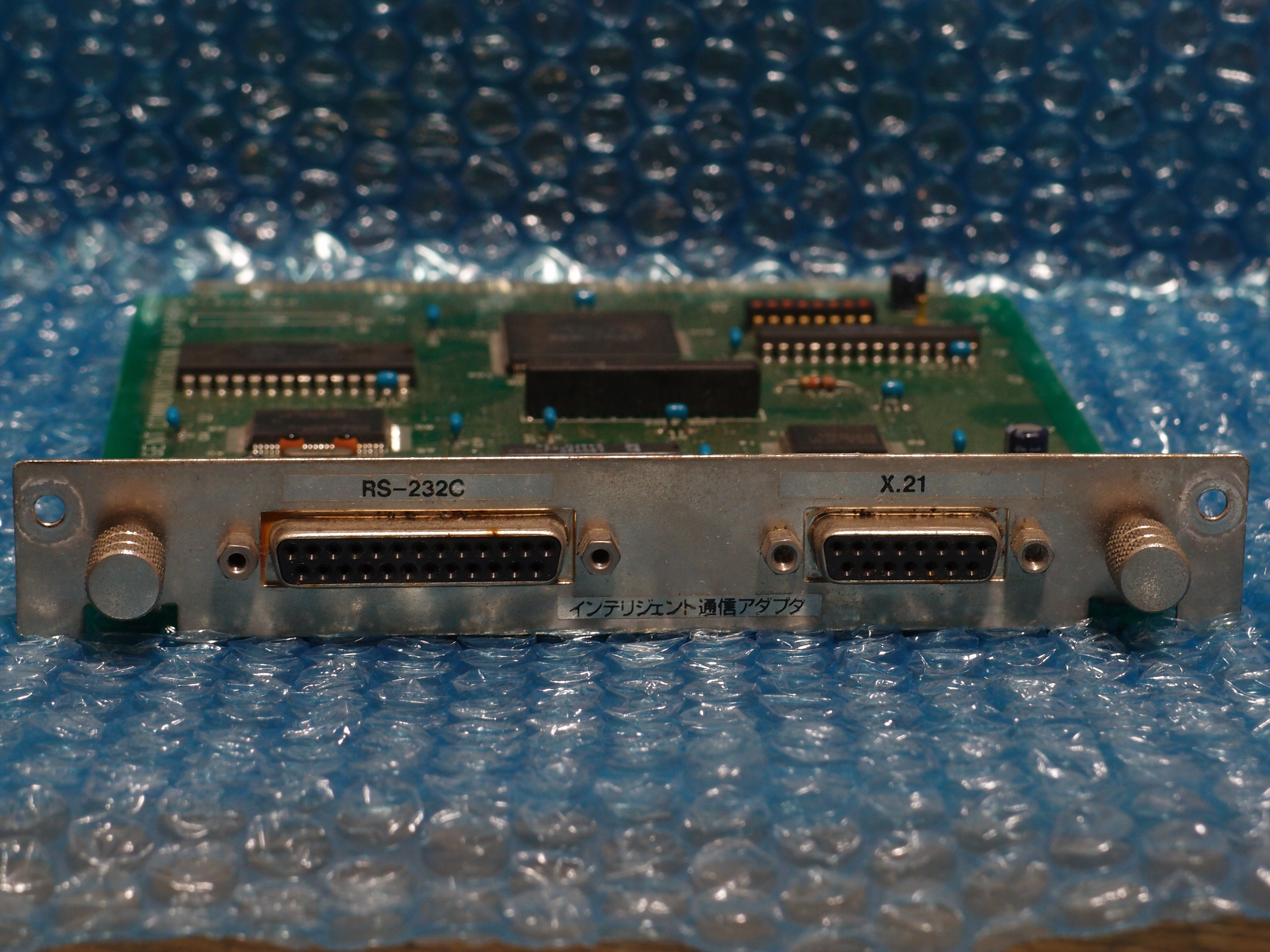
X.21 adaptor for a Japanese NEC PC-98.

X.21, also referred to as X21, is an interface specification for differential communications introduced in the mid-1970s by the CCITT, now ITU-T. X.21 was the first digital signaling interface developed. The connector specification is defined by the ISO document 4903.

At the time, most physical layer protocols such as RS-232-C and RS-449 use analog signaling. X.21 was first introduced as a means to provide a digital signaling interface for telecommunications. This includes specifications for DTE/DCE physical interface elements, alignment of call control characters and error checking, elements of the call control phase for circuit switching services, and test loops.

X.21 normally is found on a 15-pin D-sub connector and is capable of running full-duplex data transmissions. The Signal Element Timing, or clock, is provided by the carrier (the telephone company), and is responsible for correct clocking of the data. X.21 was primarily used in Europe and Japan, for example in the Scandinavian DATEX and German Datex-L circuit-switched networks during the 1980s.

A variant of X.21 can be found in select legacy applications as “circuit switched X.21”.

== Electrical characteristics ==
Electrical characteristics for V.10 and V.11 specifies voltage levels. V.10 is for unbalanced circuits, whereas V.11 is for balanced circuits.

With electrical characteristics V.11, it provides synchronous data transmission at rates from 600 bit/s to 10 Mbit/s.

With electrical characteristics V.10, it provides transmission speeds of up to 100Kb/s.
