= Circuit switching =

Telecommunications connection selection method

Circuit switching is a method of implementing a telecommunications network in which two network nodes establish a dedicated communications channel (circuit) through the network before the nodes may communicate. The circuit guarantees the full bandwidth of the channel and remains connected for the duration of the communication session. The circuit functions as if the nodes were physically connected as with an electrical circuit.

Circuit switching originated in analog telephone networks where the network created a dedicated circuit between two telephones for the duration of a telephone call. It contrasts with message switching and packet switching used in modern digital networks in which the trunklines between switching centres carry data between many different nodes in the form of data packets without dedicated circuits.

== Description ==
The defining example of a circuit-switched network is the early analogue telephone network. When a call is made from one telephone to another, switches within the telephone exchanges create a continuous wire circuit between the two telephones for as long as the call lasts.

In circuit switching, the bit delay is constant during a connection (as opposed to packet switching, where packet queues may cause varying and potentially indefinitely long packet transfer delays). No circuit can be degraded by competing users because it is protected from use by other callers until the circuit is released and a new connection is set up. Even if no actual communication is taking place, the channel remains reserved and protected from competing users.

While circuit switching is commonly used for connecting voice circuits, the concept of a dedicated path persisting between two communicating parties or nodes can be extended to signal content other than voice. The advantage of using circuit switching is that it provides for continuous transfer without the overhead associated with packets, making maximal use of available bandwidth for that communication. One disadvantage is that it can be relatively inefficient because unused capacity guaranteed to a connection cannot be used by other connections on the same network. In addition, calls cannot be established or will be dropped if the circuit is broken.

== The call ==
For call setup and control (and other administrative purposes), it is possible to use a separate dedicated signalling channel from the end node to the network. ISDN is one such service that uses a separate signalling channel while plain old telephone service (POTS) does not.

The method of establishing the connection and monitoring its progress and termination through the network may also utilize a separate control channel as in the case of links between telephone exchanges which use CCS7 packet-switched signalling protocol to communicate the call setup and control information and use TDM to transport the actual circuit data.

Early telephone exchanges were a suitable example of circuit switching. The subscriber would ask the operator to connect to another subscriber, whether on the same exchange or via an inter-exchange link and another operator. The result was a physical electrical connection between the two subscribers' telephones for the duration of the call. The copper wire used for the connection could not be used to carry other calls at the same time, even if the subscribers were in fact not talking and the line was silent.

== Alternatives ==
In circuit switching, a route and its associated bandwidth are reserved from source to destination, making circuit switching relatively inefficient since capacity is reserved whether or not the connection is in continuous use. Circuit switching contrasts with message switching and packet switching. Both of these methods can make better use of available network bandwidth between multiple communication sessions under typical conditions in data communication networks.

Message switching routes messages in their entirety, one hop at a time; that is, store and forward of the entire message. Packet switching divides the data to be transmitted into packets transmitted through the network independently. Instead of being dedicated to one communication session at a time, network links are shared by packets from multiple competing communication sessions, resulting in the loss of the quality of service guarantees that are provided by circuit switching.

Packet switching can be based on connection-oriented communication or connectionless communication. That is, based on virtual circuits or datagrams.

Virtual circuits use packet switching technology that emulates circuit switching, in the sense that the connection is established before any packets are transferred, and packets are delivered in order.

Connection-less packet switching divides the data to be transmitted into packets, called datagrams, transmitted through the network independently. Each datagram is labelled with its destination and a sequence number for ordering related packets, precluding the need for a dedicated path to help the packet find its way to its destination. Each datagram is dispatched independently and each may be routed via a different path. At the destination, the original message is reordered based on the packet number to reproduce the original message. As a result, datagram packet switching networks do not require a circuit to be established and allow many pairs of nodes to communicate concurrently over the same channel.

Multiplexing multiple telecommunications connections over the same physical conductor has been possible for a long time, but each channel on the multiplexed link was either dedicated to one call at a time or it was idle between calls.

== Examples of circuit-switched networks ==
- Public switched telephone network (PSTN)
- B channel of ISDN
- Circuit Switched Data (CSD) and High-Speed Circuit-Switched Data (HSCSD) service in cellular systems such as GSM
- Datakit
- X.21 (Used in the German DATEX-L and Scandinavian DATEX circuit switched data network)
- Optical mesh network

== See also ==
- Clos network
- Switching circuit theory
- Time-driven switching – a circuit-switching variant
