= Data terminal equipment =

Communications system equipment

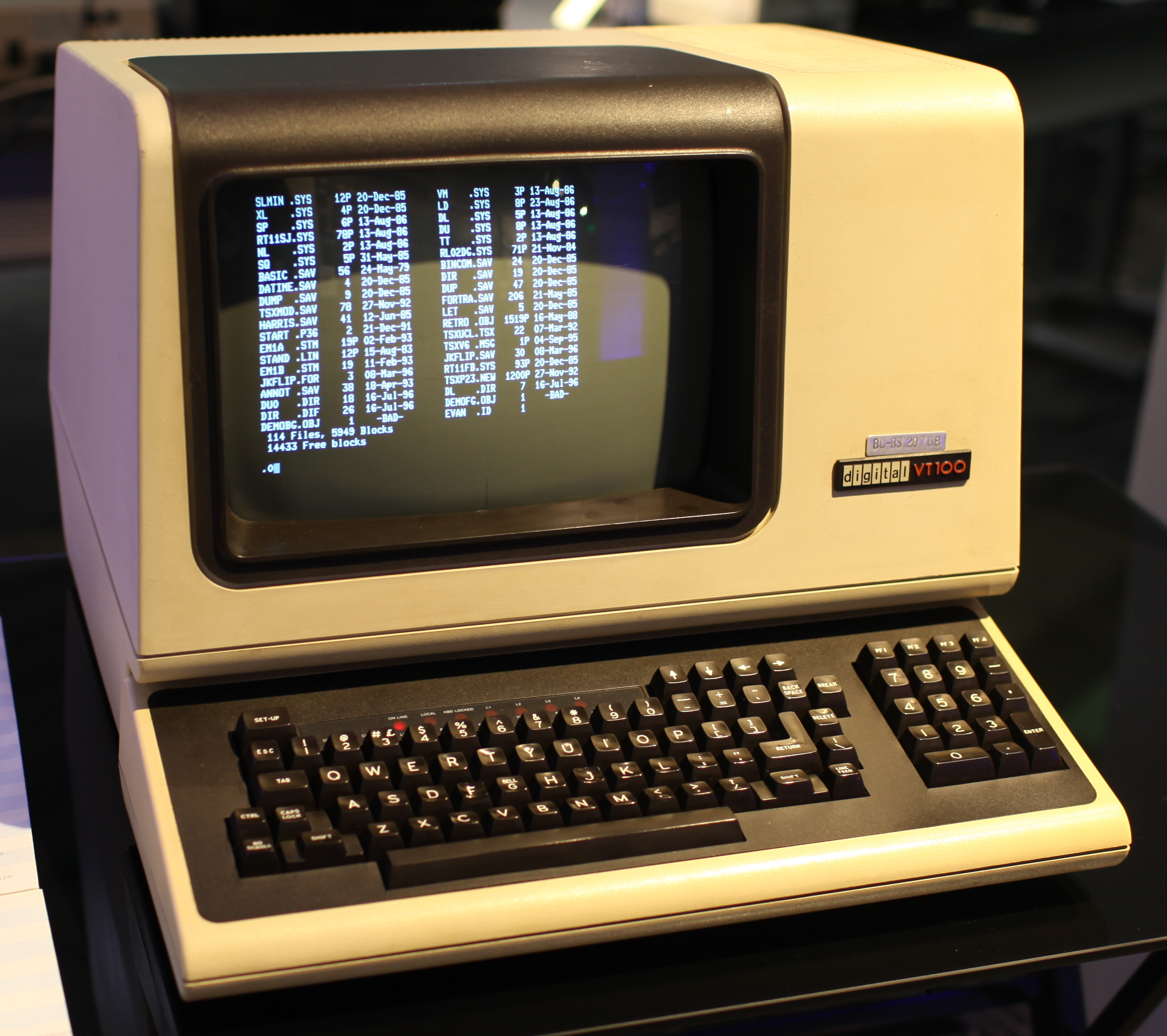
The DEC VT100, a widely emulated computer terminal

DCE and DTE network.

Data terminal equipment (DTE) is an end instrument that converts user information into signals or reconverts received signals. It is also called data processing terminal equipment or tail circuit. A DTE device communicates with the data circuit-terminating equipment (DCE), such as a modem. The DTE/DCE classification was introduced by IBM.

A DTE is the functional unit of a data station (station, terminal) that serves as a data source or a data sink and provides for the data communication control function to be performed in accordance with the link protocol.

Usually, the DTE device is the terminal (or a computer emulating a terminal), and the DCE is a modem or another carrier-owned device. The data terminal equipment may be a single piece of equipment or an interconnected subsystem of multiple pieces of equipment that perform all the required functions necessary to permit users to communicate. A user interacts with the DTE (e.g., through a human-machine interface), or the DTE may be the user.

== Connections ==
Two different types of devices are assumed on each end of the interconnecting cable for a case of simply adding DTE to the topology (e.g., to a hub, DCE), which also brings a less trivial case of interconnection of devices of the same type: DTE-DTE or DCE-DCE. Such cases need crossover cables, such as for the Ethernet or null modem for RS-232.

D-sub connectors follow another rule for pin assignment.

- 25-pin DTE devices transmit on pin 2 and receive on pin 3.
- 25-pin DCE devices transmit on pin 3 and receive on pin 2.
- 9-pin DTE devices transmit on pin 3 and receive on pin 2.
- 9-pin DCE devices transmit on pin 2 and receive on pin 3.

== Networking ==
A general rule is that DCE devices provide the clock signal (internal clocking) and the DTE device synchronizes on the provided clock (external clocking).

This term is also generally used in the Telco and Cisco equipment context to designate a network device, such as terminals, personal computers, but also routers and bridges, that is unable or configured not to generate clock signals. Hence, a direct PC to PC Ethernet connection can also be called a DTE to DTE communication. This communication is done via an Ethernet crossover cable as opposed to a PC to DCE (hub, switch, or bridge) communication, which is done via an Ethernet straight cable.

V.35 is a high-speed serial interface designed to support both higher data rates and connectivity between DTEs (data-terminal equipment) or DCEs (data-communication equipment) over digital lines.

== See also ==
- Communication endpoint
- Data circuit-terminating equipment
- End system
- Federal Standard 1037C, MIL-STD-188
- Host (network)
- Node (networking)
- Terminal (telecommunication)
- Serial port, in-depth description of pinouts
