= List of EIA standards =

This is a list of American Electronic Industries Alliance (EIA) Standards.

The EIA ceased operations on February 11, 2011, but the former sectors continue to serve the constituencies of EIA. EIA designated ECA to continue to develop standards for interconnect, passive and electro-mechanical (IP&E) electronic components under the ANSI-designation of EIA standards. All other electronic components standards are managed by their respective sectors. ECA is expected to merge with the National Electronic Distributors Association (NEDA) to form the Electronic Components Industry Association (ECIA). However, the EIA standards brand will continue for IP&E standards within ECIA. As currently authorized, any ANSI standard designated at ANSI EIA-xxx is developed and/or managed by ECA (and, in the future, ECIA).

== 1–199 ==
- TIA/EIA-41 Cellular Radiocommunications Intersystem Operations.
- EIA/TIA/IS-55 Recommended Minimum Performance Standards of 800 MHz Dual Mode Mobile Stations
- EIA/TIA/IS-66 Sectional Specification for Nonpressurized Fiber Optic Splice Closures
- EIA-96
- TIA/EIA-136-310-A-1 TDMA Third Generation Wireless - Radio Link Protocol –1
- JEP-143C Solid-State Reliability Assessment and Qualification Methodologies
- EIA-170/RS-170 Electrical Performance Standards-Monochrome Television Studio Facilities 01 November 1957.

 Note: EIA-170 only appears on the cover page of the document, internal pages are labeled RS-170 in the upper right corner. 
 EIA-170/RS-170 applies only to monochrome (black & white) video. 
 The later color video version is RS-170A which shows color burst and the 4 color field sequence of NTSC.
 The RS-170A version is only a tentative standard, and was never formally adopted. NAB Engineering Handbook Seventh Edition.[1]

- EIA-189A Formerly RS-189A. Encoded color bar signal (preceded SMPTE color bars).
- EIA-198
  - EIA RS-198-A?
  - EIA RS-198-B:1971
  - EIA-198-C:1983
  - EIA-198-D:1991 Ceramic dielectric capacitors classes I, II, III
  - EIA-198-1-E:1998
  - EIA-198-2-E:1998
  - EIA-198-3-E:1998
  - EIA-198-1-F:2002
  - EIA-198-2-F:2002
  - EIA-198-3-F:2002
  - EIA-198-3-4-F:2009

== 200–299 ==
- EIA-222 Standards for antenna mast structural integrity
- RS-225, 50Ω RF high power RF connectors, (EIA RF Connectors)
- RS-232 (or EIA-232) electrical characteristics, single-ended voltage digital interface circuit (serial data communications)
- RS-259, 75Ω RF high power RF connectors, (EIA RF Connectors)
- EIA-274 is the most common NC code format. In the machine tool industry it also known as G-code. In the PCB industry Standard Gerber, now revoked, was based on it.
- RS-279 electronic color code originally known as the RETMA color code

== 300–399 ==
- EIA/ECA-310 Cabinets, Racks, Panels, and Associated Equipment, maintained by the ECIA (includes 19-inch racks, rack units)
- EIA/TIA-329-B Minimum Standards for Communication Antennas Part I - Base Station Antennas
- EIA/TIA-329-B-1 Minimum Standards for Communication Antennas Part II - Vehicular Antennas
- EIA-343 Formerly RS-343. Signal standard for non-broadcast high resolution monochrome video.
- EIA-343A Formerly RS-343 A. Video signal standard for high resolution monochrome CCTV. Based on EIA-343.
- EIA-364-38 TP-38D Cable Pull-Out Test Procedure for Electrical Connectors
- EIA-370-B Designation System for Semiconductor Devices.

== 400–499 ==
- RS-422 (or EIA-422 or TIA-422), electrical characteristics of the balanced voltage digital interface circuit (serial data communications)
- RS-423, a standard for serial communications
- RS-449 for serial data communications
- EIA/TIA-455-A Standard Test Procedure for Fiber Optic Fibers, Cables, Transducers, Sensors, Connecting and Terminating Devices, and Other Fiber Optic Components
- EIA/TIA-455-12A FOTP-12 Fluid Immersion Test for Fiber Optic Components
- EIA/TIA-455-37A FOTP-37 Low or High Temperature Bend Test for Fiber Optic Cable
- EIA/TIA-455-48B FOTP-48 Measurement of Optical Fiber Cladding Diameter Using Laser-Based Instruments
- EIA/TIA-455-87B FOTP-87 Fiber Optic Cable Knot Test
- EIA/TIA-455-188 FOTP-188 Low Temperature Testing of Fiber Optic Components
- EIA-476 Date Code Marking
- EIA-RS-481 Taping/Leadless Components for Automatic Placement
- RS-485 Electrical Characteristics of Generators and Receivers for Use in Balanced Digital Multipoint Systems (serial data communications)
- RS-494 A 1983 Binary Cutter Location (BCL) standard for CNC

== 500–599 ==
- EIA-535 Fixed Tantalum Capacitors
- TIA-568 cable wiring standard for structured cabling (Commercial Building Telecommunications Cabling Standard)
- EIA/TIA-569 Commercial Building Standard for Telecommunications Pathways and Spaces
- EIA/TIA-570 Residential and Light Commercial Telecommunications Wiring Standard
- TIA-574 standardizes the 9-pin D-subminiature connector pinout for use with EIA-232 electrical signalling

== 600–699 ==
- EIA-608 standard for closed captioning for NTSC TV broadcasts in the United States and Canada
- TIA/EIA-634-B MC-BS Interface for Public Wireless Communications Systems
- EIA/TIA-662 standard for Personal Wireless Telecommunications (PWT).
- TIA/EIA-667 Personal Access Communications System Wireless User Premises Equipment (PACS-WUPE) Air Interface Standard

== 700–799 ==
- TIA/EIA/IS-707-A Data Service Options for Wideband Spread Spectrum Systems
- EIA-708 is the standard for closed captioning for ATSC digital television streams in the United States and Canada.
- CEA-709.1-B Control Network Protocol Specification

== 800–899 ==
- EIA/CEA-861 A DTV Profile for Uncompressed High Speed Digital Interfaces (now CTA-861)
- TIA/EIA/IS-880 TIA-41-D Based Network Enhancements for CDMA Packet Data Service (C-PDS) Phase 1

== 900–999 ==
- TIA-968-A Technical Requirements for Connection of Terminal Equipment to the Telephone Network

== 1000–1099 ==
- TIA-1096-A Connector Requirements for Connection of Terminal Equipment to the Telephone Network

== 2000–2099 ==
- TIA/EIA/IS-2000.5-A Upper Layer (Layer 3) Signaling Standard for cdma2000 Spread Spectrum Systems
- TIA/EIA/IS-2000.5-C Upper Layer (Layer 3) Signaling Standard for cdma2000 Spread Spectrum Systems

== 3100–3199 ==
- EIA SP 3128 polarizing/coding key overstress test procedure for electrical connectors

== Notes ==
- The above list of standards is not only incomplete, but also out of date. For example, the standard on capacitor dielectric classes is as of Nov 2002: EIA-198-1-F Ceramic Dielectric Capacitors: Classes I, II, III, and IV
- RS is for "Recommended Standard", an early prefix used for electronic standards

== See also ==
- SCART
- ANSI
- EIA Recommended Standard
