= PWT =

PWT may refer to:

- Pacific Western Transportation
- Palau Time
- Penn World Table
- Personal Wireless Telecommunications
- Plain White T's, American pop rock band
- Poor White Trash
- Press Women of Texas
- Pro Wrestling Tees
- Rogožarski PVT
- Bremerton National Airport in Bremerton, Washington, USA
- Pennyweight
- Pokémon World Tournament, a battle facility in Pokémon Black 2 and White 2
- Pacific War Time, a time-zone designation in the United States
