= Breakout box =

Electrical test equipment

A breakout box is a piece of electrical test equipment used to support integration testing, expedite maintenance, and streamline the troubleshooting process at the system, subsystem, and component-level by simplifying the access to test signals. Breakout boxes span a wide spectrum of functionality. Some serve to break out every signal connection coming into a unit, while others breakout only specific signals commonly monitored for either testing or troubleshooting purposes. Some have electrical connectors, and others have optical fiber connectors.

A breakout box serves as a troubleshooting tool to determine the wiring of an electrical connector interface on a networking device or computer. Typically, a breakout box is inserted between two electrical devices to determine which signal or power interconnects are active. Breakout boxes are handy in troubleshooting connection problems resulting from manufacturing errors (e.g., miswiring) or defective interconnects resulting from broken wiring. Breakout boxes are specific examples of a more general category of network testing equipment called "status monitors".

Various such monitoring devices are available for testing serial interfaces, including RS-232, RS-449, V.35, and X.21, as well as specialty interfaces. They generally come with several kinds of connectors and are quick and easy to use for isolating problems with serial transmission connections in networking, telecommunications, and industrial settings.

== Variants ==
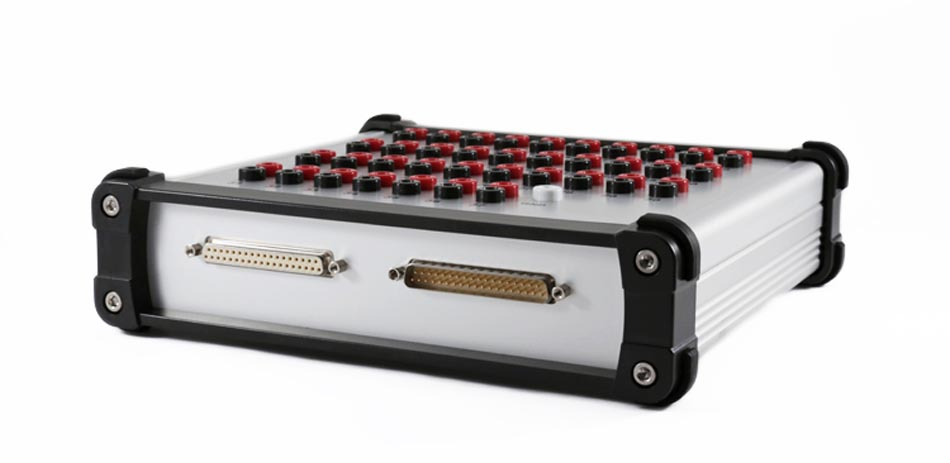
T1000-37 Tesuto Breakout box employing commonly used 37 position D-sub connectors that break out to banana jack test points.

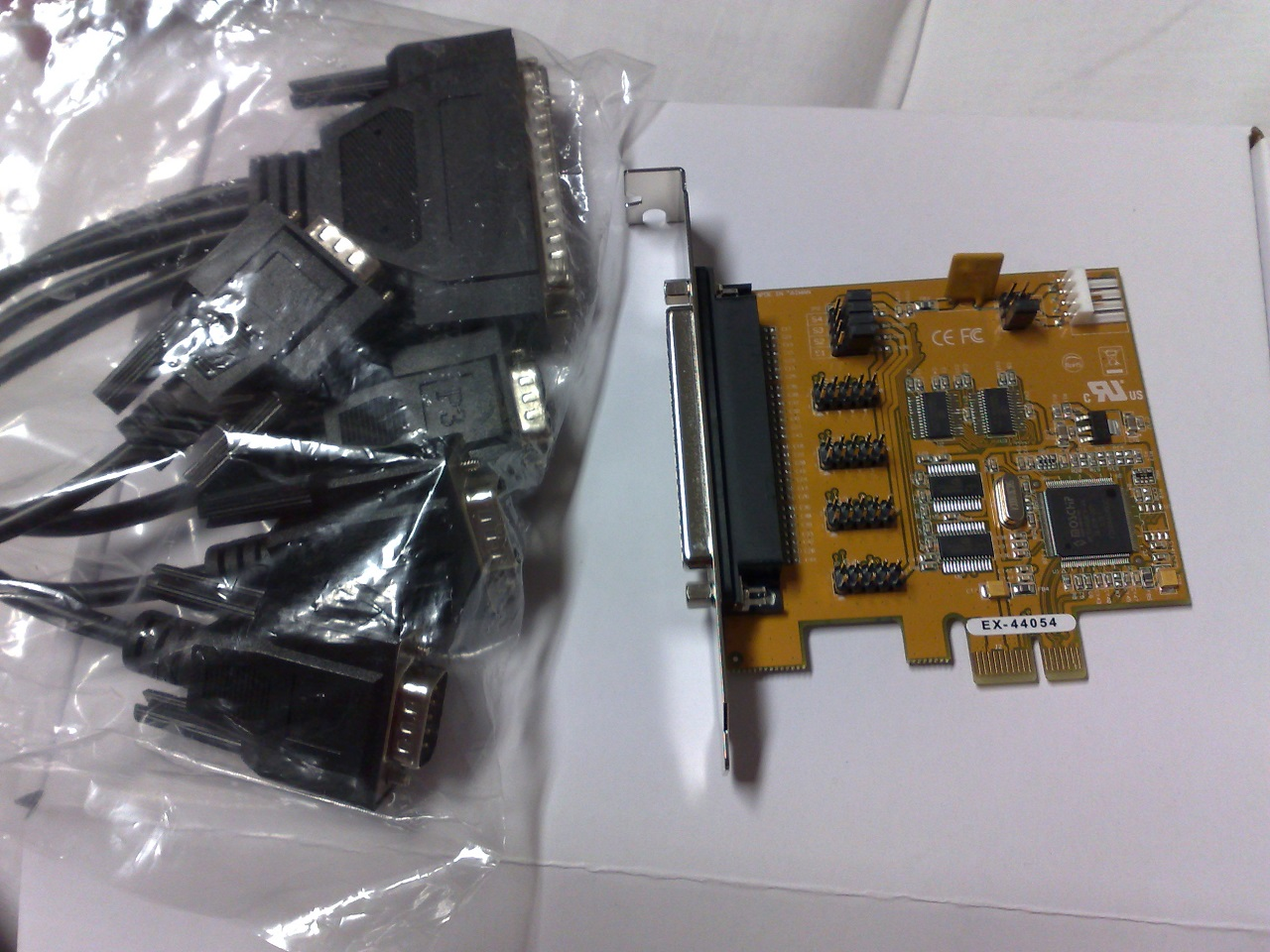
A four-port serial (RS-232) PCI Express ×1 expansion card with an octopus cable that breaks the card's DC-37 connector into four standard DE-9 connectors

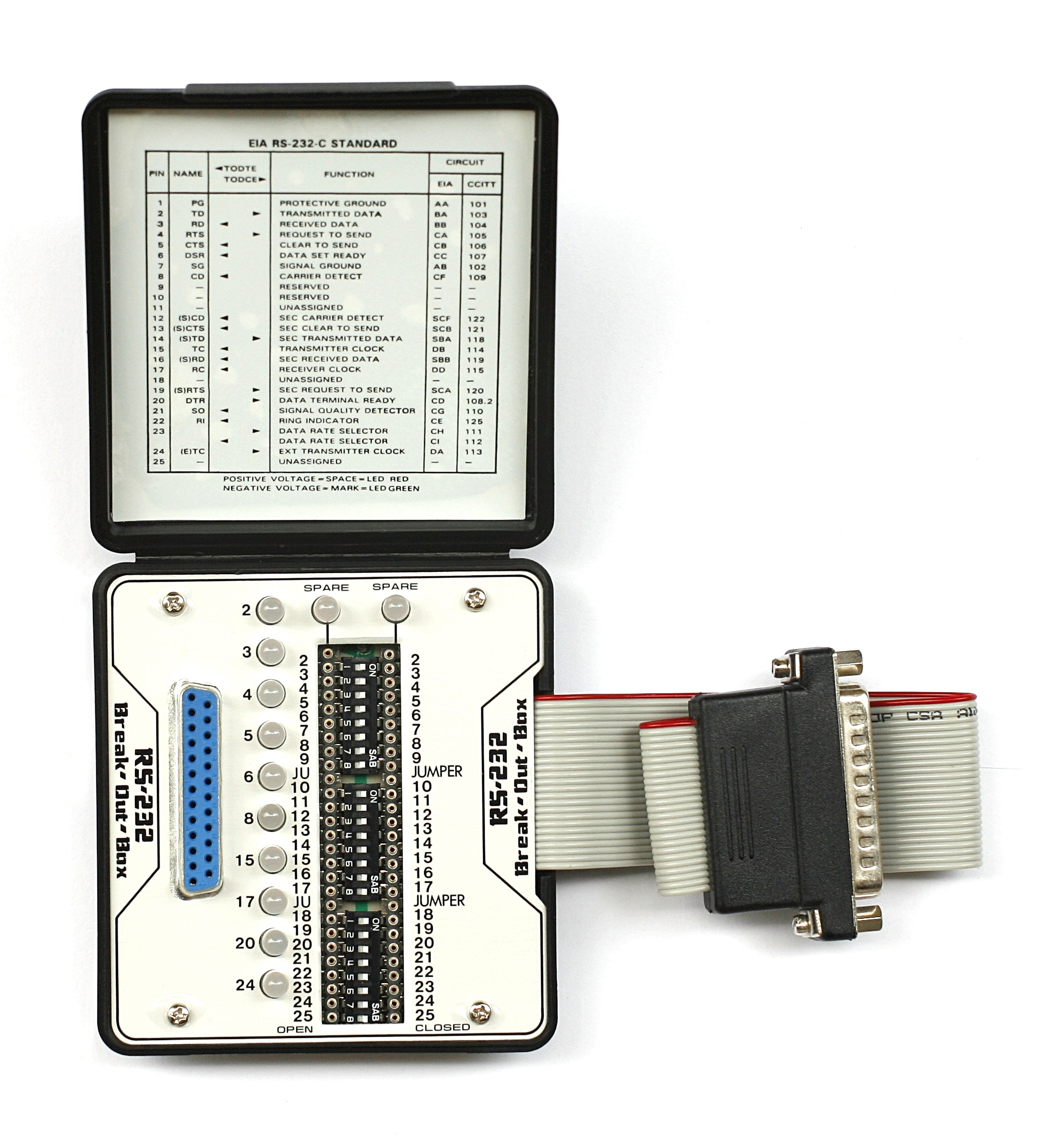
Example of a pocket-sized RS-232 breakout box that features switches to reconfigure or patch any or all the active circuitry. This unit has one DB25 male and one DB25 female RS-232 connector

The term breakout box is derived from the mechanical enclosure in which a connector's aggregate connections are separated (i.e., broken out) into the individual signal or current-carrying wires or cables. Often, if there are only a few connections, then a breakout cable (also called an octopus cable) may be used, as is common on notebook computers.

The most common breakout boxes use D-subminiature connectors (sometimes referred to as D-sub connectors and sometimes erroneously as DB connectors) and are configured with both male and female DE-9, DA-15, DB-25, DC-37 or DD-50 standard density connectors and related test points. These units can also be used to simulate special cables, interconnect RS-232 devices, or adapt test equipment to an RS-232 device.

- Breakout boxes for post-production studio editing suites. Breakout boxes (also called patch bays or patch panels) are used to patch audio/video output signals from multiple sources and connect them to other devices quickly. These boxes range from simple analog audio interconnects with up to 96 audio ins/outs to complex plug-in component with composite video, S-Video, HDMI, RS422 control, and digital signaling.
- Industrial I/O breakout box. A piece of electronic test equipment used for diagnosing problems in computer communications, typically over a serial port. The breakout box sits between two pieces of equipment and usually has some LEDs to display the status of the different signals in the serial cable. It will also often have DIP switches to let the user connect or disconnect different signals in the cable. It will usually have connector pins that let the user short pins together using electrical jumpers or gain access to individual signal lines with an oscilloscope or other test equipment.
- RS-232 breakout box: Typically, RS-232 breakout boxes offer complete control of the RS-232 interface, test, re-wire, and open signal lines. These devices are pocket-sized for circuit testing, monitoring, and patching. They usually provide ten interface signal powered LEDs to permanently monitor TD, RD, RTS, CTS, DSR, CD, TC, RC, DTR (E) TC signals, as well as enabling the breakout of individual circuits or reconfiguration or patching any or all of the 24 active switch positions.
- Personal computer sound cards. A DA15 connector on the outside of the board is often broken out into DIN connectors for MIDI. Some professional audio applications use rackmount breakout boxes. A patch panel can also function as a breakout box, in the case of multi-channel DB25 (or other) connectors used for multi-track recording.
- Docking stations for notebook computers. These draw the signal for multiple connectors from the pins of one connector.
- Electronic control units (ECUs) in automotive engines have proprietary connectors that are densely packed, environmentally sealed, and difficult to gain access to without causing damage. The manufacturer sometimes provides a breakout box to allow service engineers to test the unit.
