= RS-232 =

Standard for serial communication

EIA-232 Standard
- Interconnection of Data Terminal Equipment with a Communications Channel
- Data circuit-terminating equipment (DCE) and data terminal equipment (DTE) network
- Status: Active
- Year started: 1960 (66 years ago)
- First published: 1 May 1960 (66 years ago)
- Latest version: TIA-232-F; 1 October 1997 (29 years ago)
- Organization: Electronic Industries Association
- Series: EIA Recommended Standards
- Related standards: TIA/EIA-422; ITU-T/CCITT V.24; ITU-T/CCITT V.28
- Successor: TIA/EIA-422
- Domain: Telecommunications, Computing, Electronics

RS-232 protocol
- Governing body: Electronic Industries Association
- Standard: EIA-232

Protocol information
- Network topology: Point-to-point, unidirectional point-to-point
- Maximum speed: 20 kbit/s
- Mode of operation: Serial
- Voltage: 3 to 15 V_{pp} (maximum voltage for each line)
- Mark(1): Negative voltage
- Space(0): Positive voltage
- Available signals: DTR, DCD, DSR, RI, RTS, RTR, CTS, TxD, RxD, GND, PG
- Connector types: DB-25 connector

A DB-25 connector as described in the RS-232 standard

In telecommunications, RS-232 or Recommended Standard 232 is a standard introduced in 1960 for serial communication transmission of data. It formally defines signals connecting between a DTE (data terminal equipment) such as a computer terminal or PC, and a DCE (data circuit-terminating equipment or data communication equipment), such as a modem. The standard defines the electrical characteristics and timing of signals, the meaning of signals, and the physical size and pinout of connectors. The current version of the standard is TIA-232-F Interface Between Data Terminal Equipment and Data Circuit-Terminating Equipment Employing Serial Binary Data Interchange, issued in 1997.

The RS-232 standard is commonly used with serial ports and serial cables. It is widely used in industrial communication devices.

A serial port complying with the RS-232 standard was once a standard feature of many types of computers. Personal computers used them for connections not only to modems, but also to printers, computer mice, data storage, uninterruptible power supplies, and other peripheral devices.

Compared with later interfaces such as RS-422, RS-485 and Ethernet, RS-232 has lower transmission speed, shorter maximum cable length, larger voltage swing, larger standard connectors, no multipoint capability and limited multidrop capability. In modern personal computers, USB has displaced RS-232 from most of its peripheral interface roles. Thanks to their simplicity and past ubiquity, however, RS-232 interfaces are still used—particularly in industrial CNC machines, networking equipment and scientific instruments where a short-range, point-to-point, low-speed wired data connection is fully adequate.

== Scope of the standard ==
The Electronic Industries Association (EIA) standard RS-232-C as of 1969 defines:

- Electrical signal characteristics such as logic levels, baud rate, timing, and slew rate of signals, voltage withstand level, short-circuit behavior, and maximum load capacitance.
- Interface mechanical characteristics, pluggable connectors and pin identification.
- Functions of each circuit in the interface connector.
- Standard subsets of interface circuits for selected telecom applications.

The standard does not define such elements as the character encoding (i.e. ASCII, EBCDIC, or others), the framing of characters (start or stop bits, etc.), transmission order of bits, or error detection protocols. The character format and transmission bit rate are set by the serial port hardware, typically a UART, which may also contain circuits to convert the internal logic levels to RS-232 compatible signal levels. The standard does not define bit rates for transmission, except that it says it is intended for bit rates lower than 20,000 bits per second.

== History ==
RS-232 was first introduced in 1960 by the Electronic Industries Association (EIA) as a Recommended Standard. The original DTEs were electromechanical teletypewriters, and the original DCEs were (usually) modems. When electronic terminals (smart and dumb) began to be used, they were often designed to be interchangeable with teletypewriters, and so supported RS-232.

=== Revisions A through C ===
Throughout the 1960s, the 232 Standard underwent a few iterations following the major innovations in computer and networking technology.

In October 1963, the EIA published its first revision, EIA RS-232-A. This revision introduced iterative improvements including different connector types and different voltage ranges.

In October 1965, the EIA published EIA RS-232-B. This revision increased the capacitance specifications to allow longer cable lengths and increase signal timing. It also dropped the voltage from 25 V_{pp} to 15 V_{pp}.

In August of 1969, the EIA published EIA RS-232-C: Interface Between Data Terminal Equipment and Data Communication Equipment Employing Serial Binary Data Interchange. This revision dropped the voltage down to 12 V_{pp} and introduced the use of Data Communication Equipment (DCE) modems with the standard.

=== RS-232 Modernization and Revision D ===
As technology progressed, the RS-232 standard was starting to become obsolete.

In 1975, modifications to the RS-232 standard resulted in the creation of its supposed successor, the EIA RS-422 standard. However, as the RS-422 standard was being developed, the RS-232 standard was gaining popularity for use in computing, so the standard was updated to accommodate legacy systems and its continued usage.

In 1981, the EIA dropped the Recommended Standard (RS) nomenclature for all of their published standards and republished the 232 standard as EIA-232-C.

In 1986, the EIA published ANSI/EIA-232-D. The revision included major changes including incorporating the DB-25 connector as part of the standard (it was only referenced in the appendix of RS-232-C), and setting the circuit capacitance limit to 2.5 nF.

=== Telecommunications Industry Association and Revision E ===
In 1988, the Telecommunications Industry Association (TIA) was founded, as part of a merger of several organizations under the EIA.

In 1991, the TIA and the EIA, together, released ANSI/EIA/TIA-232-E-1991: Interface Between Data Terminal Equipment and Data Communications Equipment Employing Serial Binary Data Interchange, adding the smaller standard D-shell 26-pin "Alt A" connector, and made other changes to improve compatibility with ITU-T/CCITT V.24 (circuit identification), ITU-T/CCITT V.28 (signal voltage and timing characteristics) and ISO 2110.

=== EIA Name Change and Revision F ===
In 1997, the Electronic Industries Association reorganized under the Electronics Industries Alliance, with the Telecommunications Industry Association serving as its subsidiary. That October, the TIA published TIA ANSI/TIA/EIA-232-F: Interface between Data Terminal Equipment and Data Circuit-Terminating Equipment Employing Serial Binary Data Interchange.

In 2002, the EIA delegated the standard entirely to the TIA, and Revision F was republished under TIA ANSI/TIA-232-F (R 2002), by the TR-30 Multi-Media Access, Protocols and Interfaces committee.

=== Post EIA dissolution ===
Following the dissolution of the Electronic Industries Alliance, the TIA reaffirmed the standard as TIA TIA-232-F (R 2012) in 2012 with no official changes or revisions. No official changes have been made to the standard since.

== Limitations of the standard ==
Because RS-232 is used beyond the original purpose of interconnecting a terminal with a modem, successor standards have been developed to address the limitations. Issues with the RS-232 standard include:

- The large voltage swings and requirement for positive and negative supplies increases power consumption of the interface and complicates power supply design. The voltage swing requirement also limits the upper speed of a compatible interface.
- Single-ended signaling referred to a common signal ground limits the noise immunity and transmission distance.
- Multi-drop connection among more than two devices is not defined. While multi-drop "work-arounds" have been devised, they have limitations in speed and compatibility.
- The standard does not address the possibility of connecting a DTE directly to a DTE, or a DCE to a DCE. Null modem cables can be used to achieve these connections, but these are not defined by the standard, and some such cables use different connections than others.
- The definitions of the two ends of the link are asymmetric. This makes the assignment of the role of a newly developed device problematic; the designer must decide on either a DTE-like or DCE-like interface and which connector pin assignments to use.
- The handshaking and control lines of the interface are intended for the setup and teardown of a dial-up communication circuit; in particular, the use of handshake lines for flow control is not reliably implemented in many devices.
- No method is specified for sending power to a device. While a small amount of current can be extracted from the DTR and RTS lines, this is only suitable for low-power devices such as mice.

Because the standard did not foresee the requirements of devices such as computers, printers, test instruments, POS terminals, and so on, designers implementing an RS-232-compatible interface on their equipment often interpreted the standard idiosyncratically. The resulting common problems were non-standard pin assignment of circuits on connectors, and incorrect or missing control signals. The lack of adherence to the standards produced a thriving industry of breakout boxes, patch boxes, test equipment, books, and other aids for the connection of disparate equipment. A common deviation from the standard was to drive the signals at a reduced voltage. Some manufacturers therefore built transmitters that supplied +5 V and −5 V and labeled them as "RS-232 compatible".

== Role in modern personal computers ==
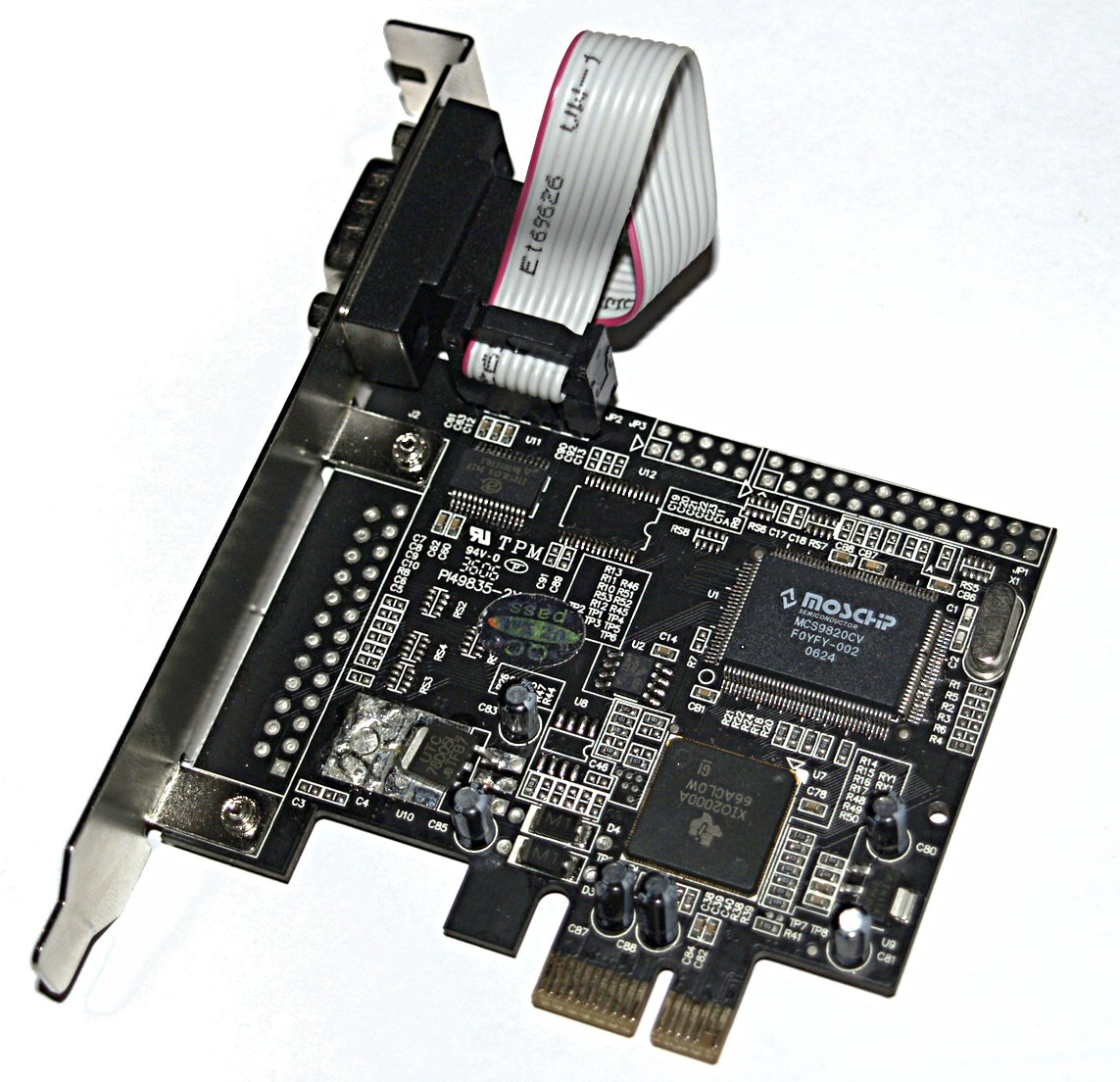
PCI Express x1 card with one RS-232 port on a nine-pin connector

In the book PC 97 Hardware Design Guide, Microsoft deprecated support for the RS-232 compatible serial port of the original IBM PC design. Today, RS-232 has mostly been replaced in personal computers by USB for local communications. Advantages compared to RS-232 are that USB is faster, uses lower voltages, and has connectors that are simpler to connect and use. Disadvantages of USB compared to RS-232 are that USB is more susceptible to electromagnetic interference (EMI) and that maximum cable length defined by standards is much shorter (15 meters for RS-232 versus 3–5 meters for USB, depending on the USB version and use of active cables). RS-232 cable lengths of 2000 meters are possible with appropriate line drivers.

In fields such as laboratory automation or surveying, RS-232 devices continue to be used. Some types of programmable logic controllers, variable-frequency drives, servo drives, and computerized numerical control equipment are programmable via RS-232. Computer manufacturers have responded to this demand by re-introducing the DE-9M connector on their computers or by making adapters available.

RS-232 ports are also commonly used to communicate to headless systems such as servers, where no monitor or keyboard is installed, during boot when an operating system is not yet running and therefore no network connection is possible. A computer with an RS-232 serial port can communicate with the serial port of an embedded system (such as a router) as an alternative to monitoring over Ethernet.

Personal computers (and other devices) also made use of the standard so that they could connect to existing equipment. For many years, an RS-232-compatible port was a standard feature for serial communications, such as modem connections, on many computers (with the computer acting as the DTE). It remained in widespread use into the late 1990s. In personal computer peripherals, it has largely been supplanted by other interface standards, such as USB. RS-232 is still used to connect older designs of peripherals, industrial equipment (such as PLCs), console ports, and special purpose equipment.

== Physical interface ==
In RS-232, user data is sent as a time-series of bits. Both synchronous and asynchronous transmissions are supported by the standard. In addition to the data circuits, the standard defines a number of control circuits used to manage the connection between the DTE and DCE. Each data or control circuit only operates in one direction, that is, signaling from a DTE to the attached DCE or the reverse. Because transmit data and receive data are separate circuits, the interface can operate in a full duplex manner, supporting concurrent data flow in both directions. The standard does not define character framing within the data stream or character encoding.

=== Voltage levels ===
Diagrammatic oscilloscope trace of voltage levels for an ASCII "K" character (4Bh = 01001011b) with 1 start bit, 8 data bits (least significant bit first), 1 stop bit. This is typical for start-stop communications, but the standard does not dictate a character format or bit order.

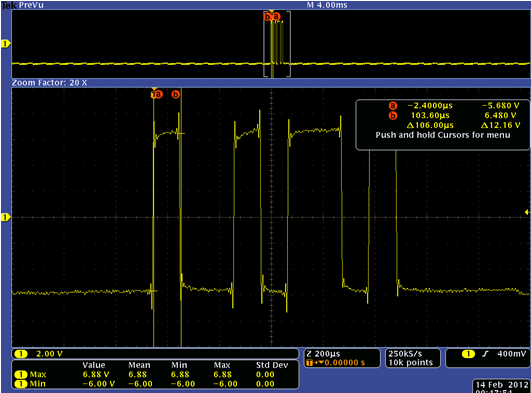
RS-232 data line on the terminals of the receiver side (RxD) probed by an oscilloscope (for an ASCII "K" character (4Bh = 01001011b) with 1 start bit, 8 data bits, 1 stop bit, and no parity bits)

The RS-232 standard defines the voltage levels that correspond to logical one and logical zero levels for the data transmission and the control signal lines. Valid signals are either in the range of +3 to +15 volts or the range −3 to −15 volts with respect to the "Common Ground" (GND) pin; consequently, the range between −3 and +3 volts is not a valid RS-232 level. For data transmission lines (TxD, RxD, and their secondary channel equivalents), logic one is represented as a negative voltage and the signal condition is called "mark". Logic zero is signaled with a positive voltage and the signal condition is termed "space". Control signals have the opposite polarity: the asserted or active state is positive voltage and the de-asserted or inactive state is negative voltage. Examples of control lines include request to send (RTS), clear to send (CTS), data terminal ready (DTR), and data set ready (DSR).

RS-232 logic and voltage levels
Data circuits	Control circuits	Voltage
0 (space)	Asserted	+3 to +15 V
1 (mark)	Deasserted	−15 to −3 V

The standard specifies a maximum open-circuit voltage of 25 volts: signal levels of ±5 V, ±10 V, ±12 V, and ±15 V are all commonly seen depending on the voltages available to the line driver circuit. Many RS-232 driver chips have inbuilt charge pump circuitry to produce the required voltages from a 3 or 5 volt supply. RS-232 drivers and receivers must be able to withstand indefinite short circuits to the ground or to any voltage level up to ±25 volts. The slew rate, or how fast the signal changes between levels, is also controlled.

Because the voltage levels are higher than logic levels typically used by integrated circuits, special intervening driver circuits are required to translate logic levels. These also protect the device's internal circuitry from short circuits or transients that may appear on the RS-232 interface, and provide sufficient current to comply with the slew rate requirements for data transmission.

Because both ends of the RS-232 circuit depend on the ground pin being zero volts, problems will occur when connecting machinery and computers where the voltage between the ground pin on one end, and the ground pin on the other is not zero. This may also cause a hazardous ground loop. Use of a common ground limits RS-232 to applications with relatively short cables. If the two devices are far enough apart or on separate power systems, the local ground connections at either end of the cable will have differing voltages; this difference will reduce the noise margin of the signals. Balanced, differential serial connections such as RS-422 or RS-485 can tolerate larger ground voltage differences because of the differential signaling.

Unused interface signals terminated to the ground will have an undefined logic state. Where it is necessary to permanently set a control signal to a defined state, it must be connected to a voltage source that asserts the logic 1 or logic 0 levels, for example with a pull-up resistor. Some devices provide test voltages on their interface connectors for this purpose.

=== Connectors ===
RS-232 devices may be classified as Data Terminal Equipment (DTE) or Data Circuit-terminating Equipment (DCE); this defines at each device which wires will be sending and receiving each signal. According to the standard, male connectors have DTE pin functions, and female connectors have DCE pin functions. Other devices may have any combination of connector gender and pin definitions. Many terminals were manufactured with female connectors but were sold with a cable with male connectors at each end; the terminal with its cable satisfied the recommendations in the standard.

The standard recommends the D-subminiature 25-pin connector up to revision C, and makes it mandatory as of revision D. Most devices only implement a few of the twenty signals specified in the standard, so connectors and cables with fewer pins are sufficient for most connections, more compact, and less expensive. Personal computer manufacturers replaced the DB-25M connector with the smaller DE-9M connector. This connector, with a different pinout (see Serial port pinouts), is prevalent for personal computers and associated devices.

Presence of a 25-pin D-sub connector does not necessarily indicate an RS-232-C compliant interface. For example, on the original IBM PC, a male D-sub was an RS-232-C DTE port (with a non-standard current loop interface on reserved pins), but the female D-sub connector on the same PC model was used for the parallel "Centronics" printer port. Some personal computers put non-standard voltages or signals on some pins of their serial ports.

=== Cables ===
The standard does not define a maximum cable length, but instead defines the maximum capacitance that a compliant drive circuit must tolerate. A widely used rule of thumb indicates that cables more than 15 m (50 ft) long will have too much capacitance, unless special cables are used. By using low-capacitance cables, communication can be maintained over larger distances up to about 300 m (1,000 ft). For longer distances, other signal standards, such as RS-422, are better suited for higher speeds.

Since the standard definitions are not always correctly applied, it is often necessary to consult documentation, test connections with a breakout box, or use trial and error to find a cable that works when interconnecting two devices. Connecting a fully standard-compliant DCE device and DTE device would use a cable that connects identical pin numbers in each connector (a so-called "straight cable"). "Gender changers" are available to solve gender mismatches between cables and connectors. Connecting devices with different types of connectors requires a cable that connects the corresponding pins according to the table below. Cables with 9 pins on one end and 25 on the other are common. Manufacturers of equipment with 8P8C connectors usually provide a cable with either a DB-25 or DE-9 connector (or sometimes interchangeable connectors so they can work with multiple devices). Poor-quality cables can cause false signals by crosstalk between data and control lines (such as Ring Indicator).

If a given cable will not allow a data connection, especially if a gender changer is in use, a null modem cable may be necessary. Gender changers and null modem cables are not mentioned in the standard, so there is no officially sanctioned design for them.

== Data and control signals ==
Male pinout of a 25-pin serial port (D-subminiature, DB-25) commonly found on 1980s computers

The following table lists commonly used RS-232 signals (called "circuits" in the specifications) and their pin assignments on the recommended DB-25 connectors (see Serial port pinouts for other commonly used connectors not defined by the standard).

Circuit			Direction		DB-25 pin
Name	Typical purpose	Abbreviation	DTE	DCE	DB-25 pin
Data Terminal Ready	DTE is ready to receive, initiate, or continue a call.	DTR	Out	In	20
Data Carrier Detect	DCE is receiving a carrier from a remote DCE.	DCD	In	Out	8
Data Set Ready	DCE is ready to receive and send data.	DSR	In	Out	6
Ring Indicator	DCE has detected an incoming ring signal on the telephone line.	RI	In	Out	22
Request To Send	DTE requests the DCE prepare to transmit data.	RTS	Out	In	4
Ready To Receive	DTE is ready to receive data from DCE. If in use, RTS is assumed to be always asserted.	RTR	Out	In	4
Clear To Send	DCE is ready to accept data from the DTE.	CTS	In	Out	5
Transmitted Data	Carries data from DTE to DCE.	TxD	Out	In	2
Received Data	Carries data from DCE to DTE.	RxD	In	Out	3
Common Ground	Zero voltage reference for all of the above.	GND	Common		7
Protective Ground	Connected to chassis ground.	PG	Common		1

The signals are named from the standpoint of the DTE. The ground pin is a common return for the other connections, and establishes the "zero" voltage to which voltages on the other pins are referenced. The DB-25 connector includes a second "protective ground" on pin 1; this is connected internally to equipment frame ground, and should not be connected in the cable or connector to signal ground.

=== Ring Indicator ===
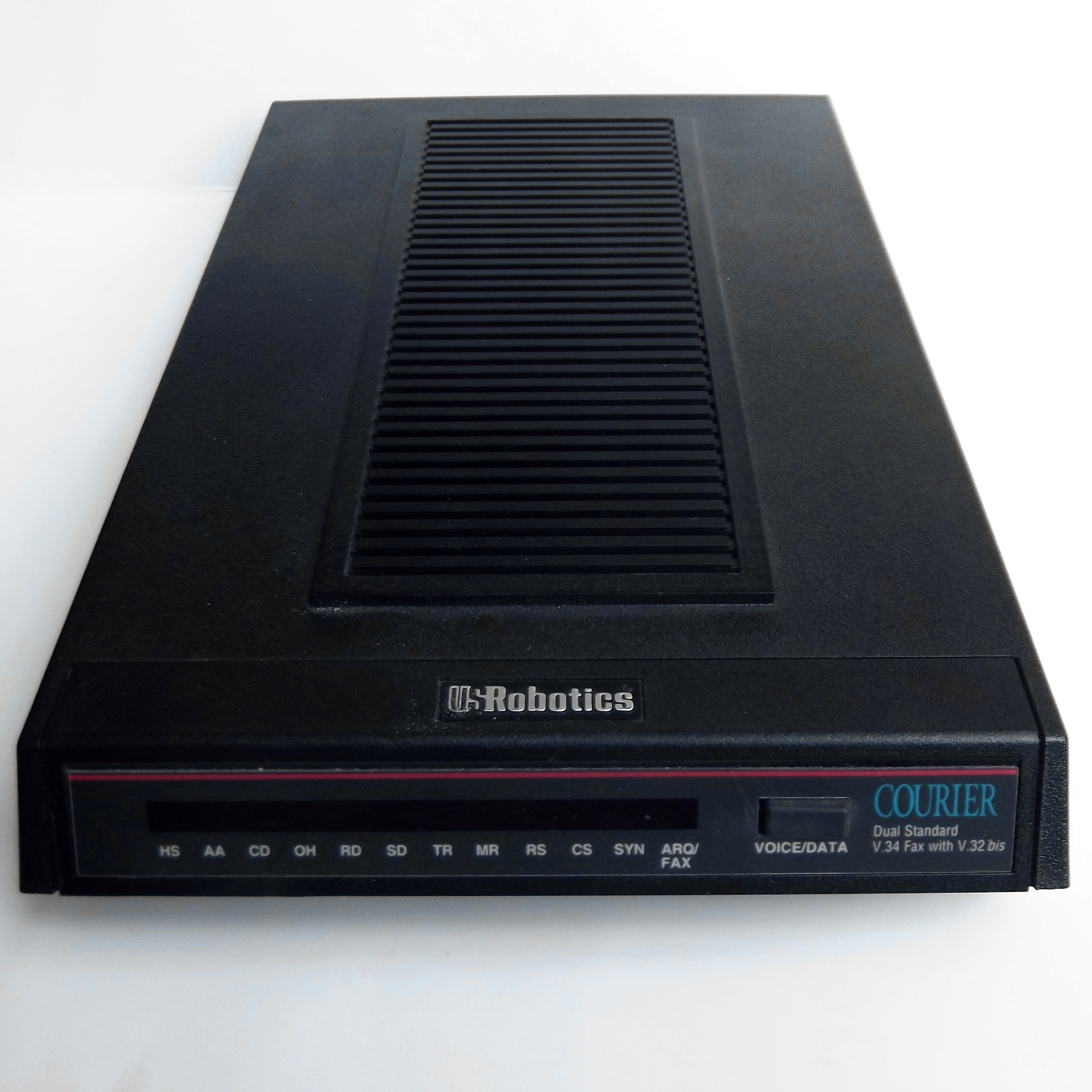
USRobotics Courier external modem had a DB-25 connector that used the Ring Indicator signal to notify the host computer when the connected telephone line was ringing

Ring Indicator (RI) is a signal sent from the DCE to the DTE device. It indicates to the terminal device that the phone line is ringing. In many computer serial ports, a hardware interrupt is generated when the RI signal changes state. Having support for this hardware interrupt means that a program or operating system can be informed of a change in state of the RI pin, without requiring the software to constantly "poll" the state of the pin. RI does not correspond to another signal that carries similar information the opposite way.

On an external modem the status of the Ring Indicator pin is often coupled to the "AA" (auto answer) light, which flashes if the RI signal has detected a ring. The asserted RI signal follows the ringing pattern closely, which can permit software to detect distinctive ring patterns.

The Ring Indicator signal is used by some older uninterruptible power supplies (UPSs) to signal a power failure state to the computer.

Certain personal computers can be configured for wake-on-ring, allowing a computer that is suspended to answer a phone call.

=== RTS, CTS, and RTR ===
The Request to Send (RTS) and Clear to Send (CTS) signals were originally defined for use with half-duplex (one direction at a time) modems such as the Bell 202. These modems disable their transmitters when not required and must transmit a synchronization preamble to the receiver when they are re-enabled. The DTE asserts RTS to indicate a desire to transmit to the DCE, and in response the DCE asserts CTS to grant permission, once synchronization with the DCE at the far end is achieved. Such modems are no longer in common use. There is no corresponding signal that the DTE could use to temporarily halt incoming data from the DCE. Thus RS-232's use of the RTS and CTS signals, per the older versions of the standard, is asymmetric.

This scheme is also employed in present-day RS-232 to RS-485 converters. RS-485 is a multiple-access bus on which only one device can transmit at a time, a concept that is not provided for in RS-232. The RS-232 device asserts RTS to tell the converter to take control of the RS-485 bus so that the converter, and thus the RS-232 device, can send data onto the bus.

Modern communications environments use full-duplex (both directions simultaneously) modems. In that environment, DTEs have no reason to deassert RTS. However, due to the possibility of changing line quality, delays in processing of data, etc., there is a need for symmetric, bidirectional flow control.

A symmetric alternative providing flow control in both directions was developed and marketed in the late 1980s by various equipment manufacturers. It redefined the RTS signal to mean that the DTE is ready to receive data from the DCE. This scheme was eventually codified in version RS-232-E (actually TIA-232-E by that time) by defining a new signal, "RTR (Ready to Receive)", which is CCITT V.24 circuit 133. TIA-232-E and the corresponding international standards were updated to show that circuit 133, when implemented, shares the same pin as RTS (Request to Send), and that when 133 is in use, RTS is assumed by the DCE to be asserted at all times.

In this scheme, commonly called "RTS/CTS flow control" or "RTS/CTS handshaking" (though the technically correct name would be "RTR/CTS"), the DTE asserts RTS whenever it is ready to receive data from the DCE, and the DCE asserts CTS whenever it is ready to receive data from the DTE. Unlike the original use of RTS and CTS with half-duplex modems, these two signals operate independently from one another. This is an example of hardware flow control. However, "hardware flow control" in the description of the options available on an RS-232-equipped device does not always mean RTS/CTS handshaking.

Equipment using this protocol must be prepared to buffer some extra data, since the remote system may have begun transmitting just before the local system de-asserts RTR.

=== 3-wire and 5-wire RS-232 ===
A minimal "3-wire" RS-232 connection consisting only of transmit data, receive data, and ground, is commonly used when the full facilities of RS-232 are not required. Even a two-wire connection (data and ground) can be used if the data flow is one way (for example, a digital postal scale that periodically sends a weight reading, or a GPS receiver that periodically sends position, if no configuration via RS-232 is necessary). When only hardware flow control is required in addition to two-way data, the RTS and CTS lines are added in a 5-wire version.

== Seldom-used features ==
The EIA-232 standard specifies connections for several features that are not used in most implementations. Their use requires 25-pin connectors and cables.

=== Signal rate selection ===
The DTE or DCE can specify use of a "high" or "low" signaling rate. The rates, as well as which device will select the rate, must be configured in both the DTE and DCE. The prearranged device selects the high rate by setting the Data Signal Rate Selector (DSRS, pin 23) signal to ON. Sometimes called Data Rate Select (DRS), this signal should not be confused with the more commonly used Data Set Ready (DSR, pin 6).

=== Loopback testing ===
Many DCE devices have a loopback capability used for testing. When enabled, signals are echoed back to the sender rather than being sent on to the receiver. If supported, the DTE can signal the local DCE (the one it is connected to) to enter loopback mode by setting Local Loop (LL, pin 18) to ON, or the remote DCE (the one the local DCE is connected to) to enter loopback mode by setting Remote Loop (RL, pin 21) to ON. The latter tests the communications link, as well as both DCEs. When the DCE is in test mode, it signals the DTE by setting Test Indicator (TI, pin 25) to ON.

A commonly used version of loopback testing does not involve any special capability of either end. A hardware loopback is simply a wire connecting complementary pins together in the same connector (see loopback).

Loopback testing is often performed with a specialized DTE called a bit error rate tester (or BERT).

=== Timing signals ===
Some synchronous devices provide a clock signal to synchronize data transmission, especially at higher data rates. Two timing signals are provided by the DCE. Pin 15 is the transmitter clock (TCK), or send timing (ST); the DTE puts the next bit on the transmit data line (pin 2) when this clock transitions from OFF to ON (so it is stable during the ON to OFF transition when the DCE registers the bit). Pin 17 is the receiver clock (RCK), or receive timing (RT); the DTE reads the next bit from the receive data line (pin 3) when this clock transitions from ON to OFF.

Alternatively, the DTE can provide a clock signal, called transmitter timing (TT, pin 24) for transmitted data. Data is changed when the clock transitions from OFF to ON, and read during the ON to OFF transition. TT can be used to overcome the problem of propagation delay in a long cable. ST must traverse a cable of unknown length and delay, clock a bit out of the DTE after another unknown delay, and return it to the DCE over the same unknown cable delay. When sending data at high speed, the data bit may not arrive in time for the ON to OFF transition of ST.

Since the relation between the transmitted bit and TT can be fixed in the DTE design, and since both signals traverse the same cable length, using TT eliminates the issue. TT may be generated by looping ST back with an appropriate phase change to align it with the transmitted data. ST loop back to TT lets the DTE use the DCE as the frequency reference, and correct the clock to data timing.

Synchronous clocking is required for such protocols as SDLC, HDLC, and X.25.

=== Secondary channel ===
A secondary data channel, identical in capability to the primary channel, can optionally be implemented by the DTE and DCE devices. Pin assignments are as follows:

Signal	Pin
Common Ground	7 (same as primary)
Secondary Transmitted Data (STD or S.TxD)	14
Secondary Received Data (SRD or S.RxD)	16
Secondary Request To Send (SRTS or S.RTS)	19
Secondary Clear To Send (SCTS or S.CRS)	13
Secondary Carrier Detect (SDCD or S.DCD)	12

== Related standards ==
Other serial signaling standards may not interoperate with standard-compliant RS-232 ports. For example, using the TTL levels of near +5 V and 0 V puts the mark level in the undefined area of the standard. Such levels are sometimes used with NMEA 0183-compliant GPS receivers and depth finders. A chip such as MAX232 is required to convert the voltage levels.

A 20 mA current loop uses the absence of 20 mA current for high, and the presence of current in the loop for low; this signaling method is often used for long-distance and optically isolated links. Connection of a current-loop device to a compliant RS-232 port requires a level translator. Current-loop devices can supply voltages in excess of the must-withstand voltage limits of a compliant device. The original IBM PC serial port card implemented a 20 mA current-loop interface, which was never emulated by other suppliers of plug-compatible equipment.

Other serial interfaces similar to RS-232:

- RS-422 – a high-speed system similar to RS-232 but with differential signaling
- RS-423 – a high-speed system similar to RS-422 but with unbalanced signaling
- RS-449 – a functional and mechanical interface that used RS-422 and RS-423 signals; never caught on like RS-232 and was withdrawn by the EIA
- RS-485 – a descendant of RS-422 that can be used as a bus in multidrop configurations
- MIL-STD-188 – a system like RS-232 but with better impedance and rise time control. One very significant difference: RS-232 uses a positive voltage to indicate a 0 and a negative voltage to indicate a 1. MIL-STD-188 uses a negative voltage for 0 and a positive voltage for a 1.
- EIA-530 – a high-speed system using RS-422 or RS-423 electrical properties in an EIA-232 pinout configuration, thus combining the best of both; supersedes RS-449
- EIA/TIA-561 – defines RS-232 pinouts for eight-position, eight-contact (8P8C) modular connectors (which may be improperly called RJ45 connectors)
- EIA/TIA-562 – low-voltage version of EIA/TIA-232
- TIA-574 – standardizes the 9-pin D-subminiature connector pinout for use with EIA-232 electrical signalling, as originated on the IBM PC/AT
- EIA/TIA-694 – similar to TIA/EIA-232-F but with support for higher data rates up to 512 kbit/s

The International Telecommunication Union publishes standard ITR-R V.24 (formerly CCITT standard V.24), "List of Definitions for Interchange Circuits between Data Terminal Equipment (DTE) and Data Circuit-Terminating Equipment (DCE)" with circuit definitions compatible to those in EIA RS 232. V.24 does not specify signal levels or timing. Electrical parameters for signals are specified in ITU-R-V.28.

== Development tools ==
When developing or troubleshooting systems using RS-232, close examination of hardware signals can be important to find problems. This can be done using simple devices with LEDs that indicate the logic levels of data and control signals. "Y" cables may be used to allow using another serial port to monitor all traffic on one direction. A serial line analyzer is a device similar to a logic analyzer but specialized for RS-232's voltage levels, connectors, and, where used, clock signals; it collects, stores, and displays the data and control signals, allowing developers to view them in detail. Some simply display the signals as waveforms; more elaborate versions include the ability to decode characters in ASCII or other common codes and to interpret common protocols used over RS-232 such as SDLC, HDLC, DDCMP, and X.25. Serial line analyzers are available as standalone units, as software and interface cables for general-purpose logic analyzers and oscilloscopes, and as programs that run on common personal computers and devices.

== See also ==
- Comparison of synchronous and asynchronous signalling
- List of network buses
