= EIA RF Connectors =

EIA RF Connectors are used to connect two items of high power radio frequency rigid or semi-rigid (flexline) coaxial transmission line. Typically these are only required in very high power transmitting installations (above 3kW at VHF to MW) where the feedline diameters may be several inches. The connectors are always female, requiring a male coupling element or bullet to make the connection. The EIA under the Electronic Components Industry Association (http://www.ecianow.org/), are responsible for a number of standard imperial connector sizes.

== Dimensions ==
The flange design, inner and outer conductor dimensions are standardized, by EIA, in the RS-225, 50 Ω (ohm), and RS-259, 75 Ω, standards. They are commonly referred to by the inner diameter of the outer conductor in fractional inches. Sizes covered under these two standards range from 3/8 to 6 1/8 inch outside diameter (OD) for 50 Ω and 3/8 to 3 1/8 inch OD for 75 Ω. Major manufacturers like Myat and Dielectric only manufacture 6 1/8" and 9 3/16" rigid coax in both 50 and 75 Ω impedance variants. Peak pulse power handling, driven by voltage breakdown, is more or less frequency independent for any given size (and can be deduced by assuming ~300 V RMS per mm of inner to outer spacing), but the average power, limited by losses heating the centre conductors, increases approximately with the square root of the operating frequency. Commonly the limit is quoted as that dissipation that will raise the inner temperature to 100 °C when the outer is maintained constant at +40 °C. Field failures can occur at power levels well below this if the central bullet connections are not making uniform positive contact and free of contamination. Conversely the average power ratings can be significantly exceeded if there is forced air flow either through the inner conductor or through the void between the inner and outer conductors. Many years ago, the two RS standards were considered obsolete by EIA. Only recently (until 2007) there has been an effort by manufacturers in the US to update these standards.

The 7/8" is the smallest size EIA type in common use. Below this, other types such as the DIN7/16 are more popular.

The 50 Ohm range (which is most common) is commonly available in 7/8", 1-5/8", 3-1/8", 4-1/2" and 6-1/8" with power ratings from 7-160kW at band II VHF or 2.5-42kW at UHF (860MHz).

== International standards ==
The corresponding International standards are published by the International Electrotechnical Commission: IEC 60339-1 and IEC 60339-2. These standards are more complete as they include many additional sizes that are missing in the EIA standards.

== Interchangeability ==
Many of these sizes are also interchangeable with RF Connectors defined by the US military in MIL-DTL-24044.

== Gallery ==
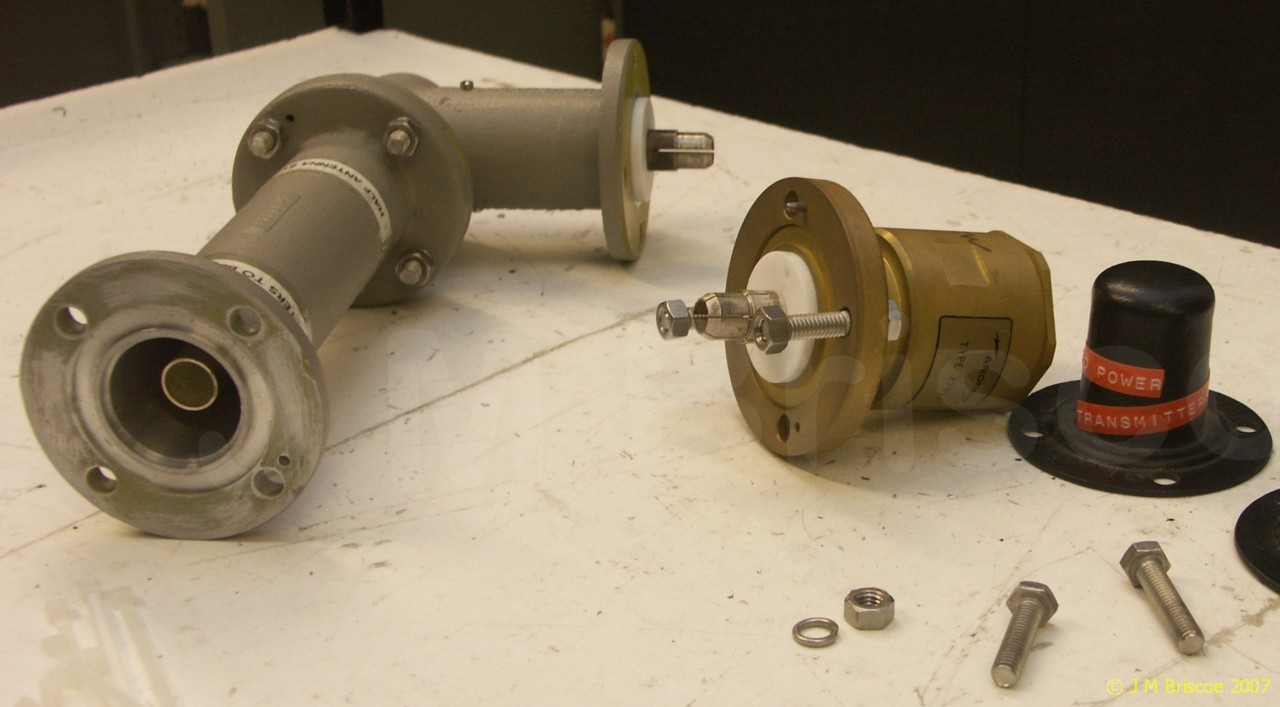
1 5/8" EIA flange connectors and adaptor to N socket

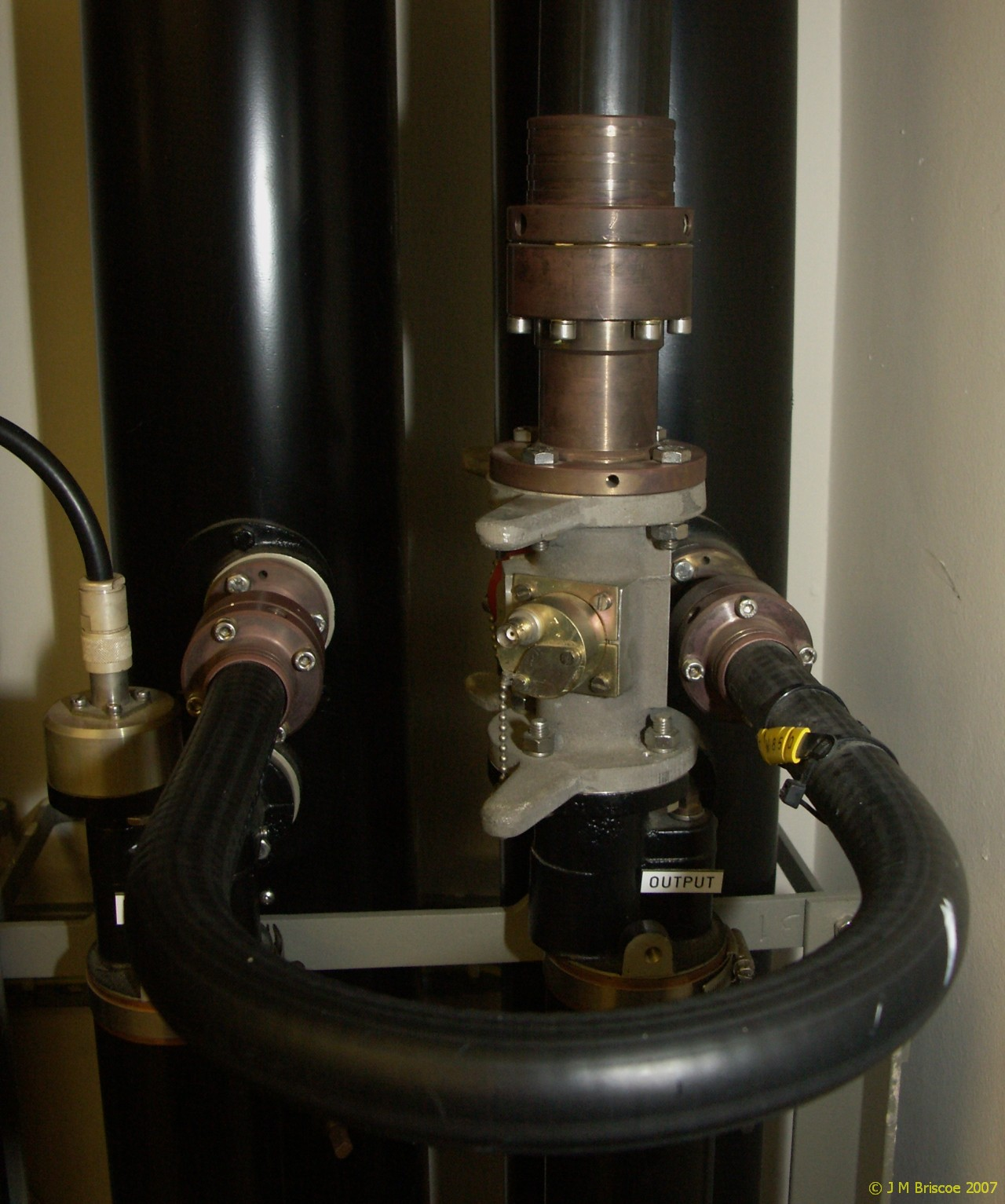
EIA flange connectors in use on Band II combiner

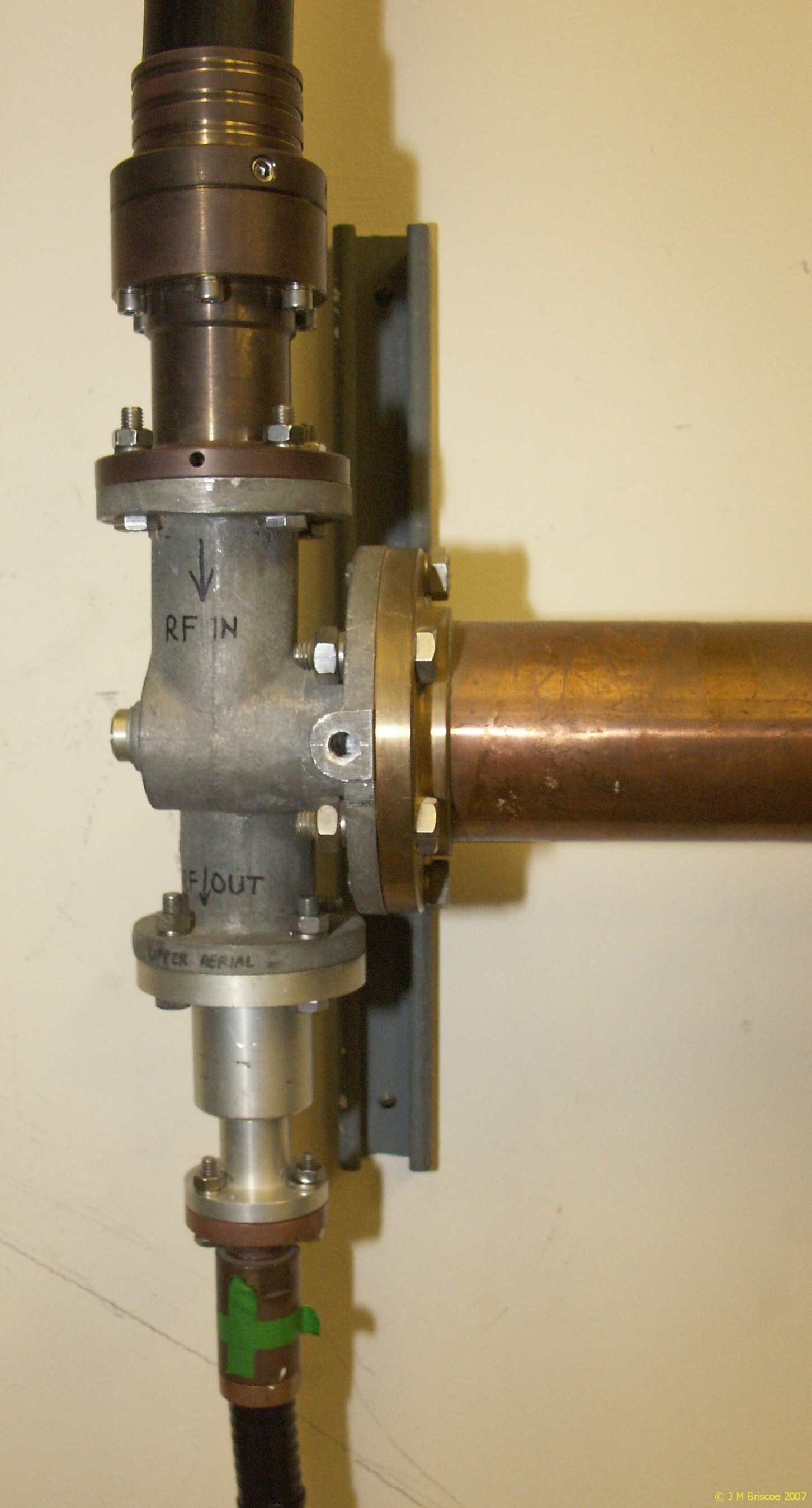
EIA flange connectors in use on a diplexer

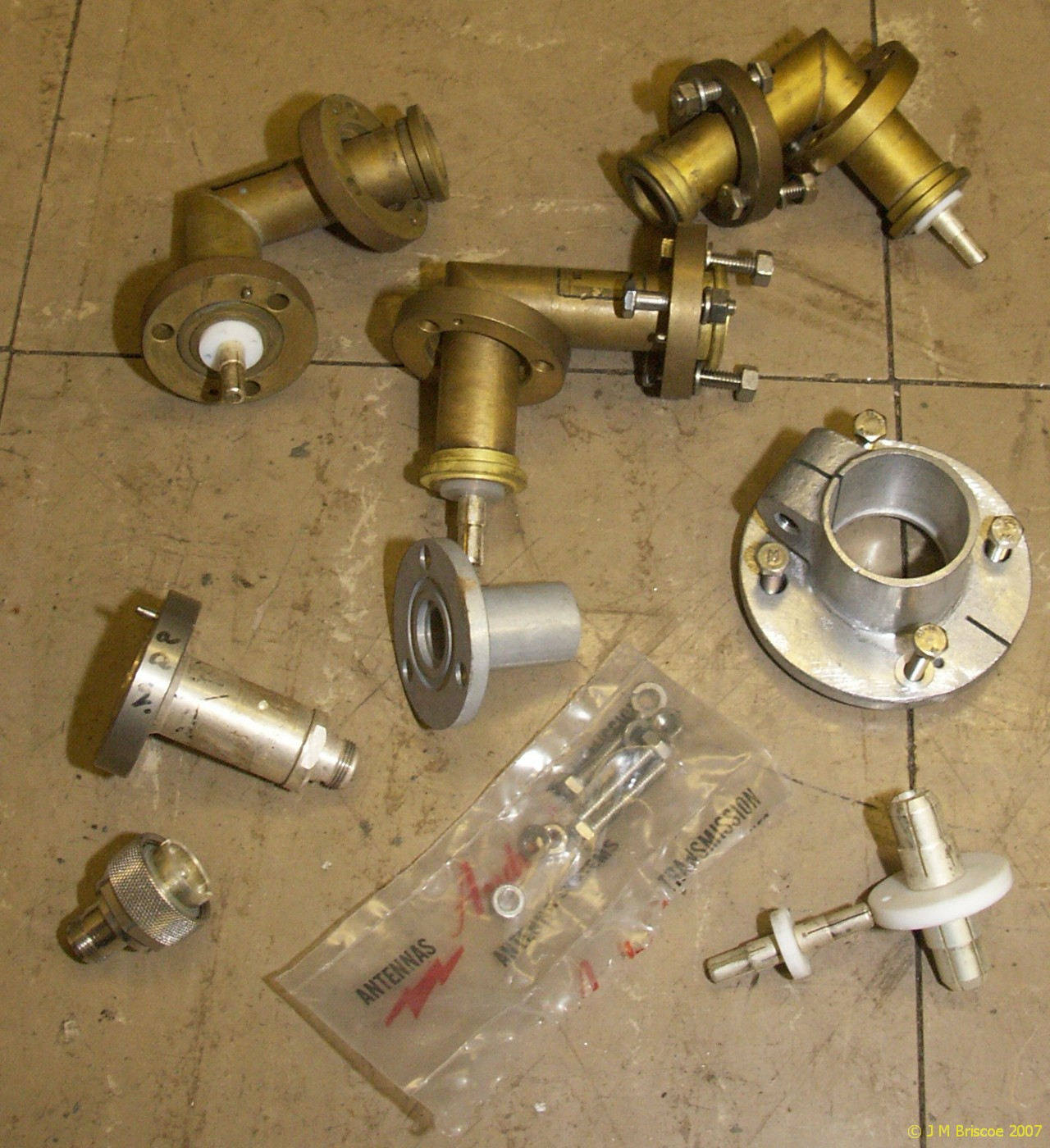
Collection of EIA Flange connectors, adaptor, bullets etc
