= RS-423 =

Standard for serial communication

RS423
- Standard: EIA RS-423

Protocol information
- Physical media: Group of copper cables
- Network topology: Point-to-point, Multi-dropped
- Maximum devices: 10 (1 driver & 10 receivers)
- Maximum distance: 1200 meters (4000 feet)
- Mode of operation: Single-ended (unbalanced)
- Maximum baud rate: Up to 100kbit/s
- Voltage: -6V to +6V (maximum)
- Mark(1): -4V to -6V
- Space(0): +4V to +6V
- Available signals: Tx, Rx, GND
- Connector types: Not specified

RS-423, also known as TIA/EIA-423, is a technical standard originated by the Electronic Industries Alliance that specifies electrical characteristics of a digital signaling circuit. RS-423 systems can transmit data on cables as long as 1,200 meters (3,900 ft). Although it was originally intended as a successor to RS-232C offering greater cable lengths, it is not widely used.

RS-423 specifies an unbalanced (single-ended) interface, similar to RS-232, with a single, unidirectional sending driver, and allowing for up to 10 receivers. It is normally implemented in integrated circuit technology and can also be employed for the interchange of serial binary signals between DTE & DCE. It is related to RS-422, which uses similar voltage levels but operates with differential signaling.

== Standard scope ==
RS-423 is the common short form title of American National Standards Institute (ANSI) standard ANSI/TIA/EIA-423-B Electrical Characteristics of Unbalanced Voltage Digital Interface Circuits and its international equivalent ITU-T Recommendation T-REC-V.10, also known as X.26. These technical standards specify the electrical characteristics of the unbalanced voltage digital interface circuit. RS-423 provides for data transmission, using unbalanced or single-ended signals, with unidirectional/non-reversible, terminated or non-terminated transmission lines, point to point, or multi-drop.

== Characteristics ==
Guidelines for data rate versus line length

RS-423 is related to the RS-422 standard, but uses single-ended signaling referenced to a common ground instead of the differential signaling used by RS-422. Use of a common ground is one weakness of RS-423 (and RS-232): if devices are far enough apart or on separate power systems, the ground will degrade between them and communications will fail, resulting in a condition that is difficult to trace.

RS-423 specifies the electrical characteristics of a single unbalanced signal. The standard was written to be referenced by other standards that specify the complete DTE/DCE interface for applications which require a unbalanced voltage circuit to transmit data.

These other standards would define protocols, connectors, pin assignments and functions. Standards such as EIA-530 (DB-25 connector) and EIA-449 (DC-37 connector) use RS-423 electrical signals.

== Applications ==
The BBC Micro computer uses RS-423 with a 5-pin DIN connector. DEC used it extensively with a Modified Modular Jack connector. This was sometimes called "DEC-423".

== See also ==
- List of network buses
- Fieldbus
- Profibus
