= EIA-530 =

Balanced serial interface

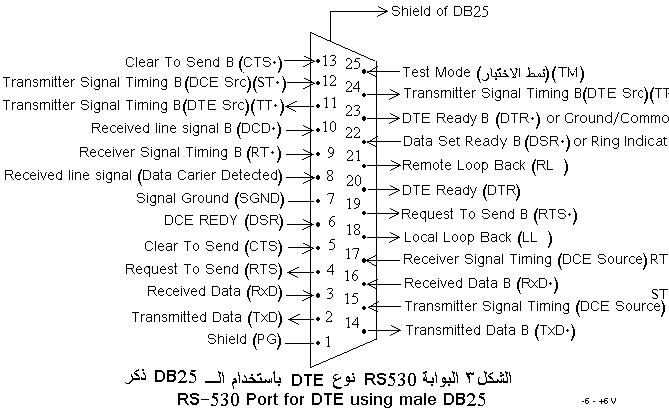
Pinout RS-530 DTE using male DB-25

Currently known as TIA-530-A, but often called EIA-530, or RS-530, is a balanced serial interface standard that generally uses a 25-pin connector, originally created by the Telecommunications Industry Association.

Finalized in 1987 (revision A finalized in 1992), the specification defines the cable between the DTE and DCE devices. It is to be used in conjunction with EIA-422 and EIA-423, which define the electrical signaling characteristics. Because TIA-530 calls for the more common 25 pin connector, it displaced the similar EIA-449, which also uses EIA-422/423, but a larger 37-pin connector.

Two types of interchange circuits ("signals" or "leads") between the DCE and DTE are defined in TIA-530: Category I, which uses the balanced characteristics of EIA-422, and Category II, which is the unbalanced EIA-423. Most of the interchange circuits are Category I, with the exception of Local Loopback (pin 18), Remote Loopback (pin 21), and Test Mode (pin 25) being Category II.

TIA-530 originally used Category I circuits for what is commonly called "Data Set Ready" (DCE Ready, pins 6 and 22) and "Data Terminal Ready" (DTE Ready, pins 20 and 23). Revision A changed these interchange circuits to Category II (para 4.3.6 and 4.3.7 of the standard) and added a "Ring Indicator" on pin 22. Pin 23 is grounded in TIA-530-A.

Confusion between the revisions has led to many incorrect wiring diagrams of this interface and most manufacturers still adhere to the original TIA-530 standard. Care should be taken to ensure devices are of the same standard before connecting to avoid complications.

Make note that the diagram shows pin 24 being "B" when it is actually "A".
