= RS-422 =

Standard for serial communication

- Standard: TIA/EIA-422

Protocol information
- Physical media: Twisted pair
- Network topology: Point-to-point, unidirectional multidrop bus
- Maximum devices: 10 (1 driver and 10 receivers)
- Maximum distance: 1,200 meters (3,900 ft)
- Mode of operation: Differential
- Maximum binary rate: 100 kbit/s – 10 Mbit/s
- Voltage: −6 to +6 V (maximum voltage for each line)
- Mark(1): Negative difference
- Space(0): Positive difference
- Available signals: Tx+, Tx−, Rx+, Rx− (full duplex)
- Connector types: Not specified

RS-422 network with multiple receivers

RS-422, also known as TIA/EIA-422, is a technical standard originated by the Electronic Industries Alliance, first issued in 1975, that specifies the electrical characteristics of a digital signaling circuit. It was meant to be the foundation of a suite of standards that would replace the older RS-232C standard with standards that offered much higher speed, better immunity from noise, and longer cable lengths. RS-422 systems can transmit data at rates as high as 10 Mbit/s, or may be sent on cables as long as 1,200 meters (3,900 ft) at lower rates. It is closely related to RS-423, which uses the same signaling systems but on a different wiring arrangement.

RS-422 specifies differential signaling, with every data line paired with a dedicated return line. It is the voltage difference between these two lines that defines the mark and space, rather than, as in RS-232, the difference in voltage between a data line and a local ground. As the ground voltage can differ at either end of the cable, this required RS-232 to use signals with greater voltages than RS-422. Using dedicated return lines and always defining ground in reference to the sender allows RS-422 to use lower voltages, allowing it to run at much higher speeds. RS-423 differs primarily in that it has a single return pin instead of one for each data pin.

== Standard scope ==
RS-422 is the common short form title of the American National Standards Institute (ANSI) standard ANSI/TIA/EIA-422-B Electrical Characteristics of Balanced Voltage Differential Interface Circuits and its international equivalent ITU-T Recommendation T-REC-V.11, also known as X.27. These technical standards specify the electrical characteristics of the balanced voltage digital interface circuit. RS-422 provides for data transmission, using balanced, or differential, signaling, with unidirectional/non-reversible, terminated or non-terminated transmission lines, point to point, or multi-drop. In contrast to EIA-485, RS-422/V.11 does not allow multiple drivers but only multiple receivers.

The first version of RS-422 was issued in 1975, with revision A issued in December 1978. Revision B, published in May 1994 was reaffirmed by the Telecommunications Industry Association in 2005.

== Characteristics ==
Data rate versus line length chart, from RS-422 Annex A.1

Several key advantages offered by this standard include the differential receiver, a differential driver and data rates as high as 10 megabits per second at 12 meters (40 ft). Since the signal quality degrades with cable length, the maximum data rate decreases as cable length increases. Figure A.1 in the annex plotting this stops at 10 Mbit/s.

The maximum cable length is not specified in the standard, but guidance is given in its annex. (This annex is not a formal part of the standard, but is included for information purposes only.) Limitations on line length and data rate vary with the parameters of the cable length, balance, and termination, as well as the individual installation. Figure A.1 shows a maximum length of 1,200 meters (3,900 ft), but this is with a termination, and the annex discusses the fact that many applications can tolerate greater timing and amplitude distortion, and that experience has shown that the cable length may be extended to several kilometers. Conservative maximum data rates with 24AWG UTP (POTS) cable are 10 Mbit/s at 12 m (39 ft) to 90 kbit/s at 1,200 m (3,900 ft), as shown in the figure A.1. This figure is a conservative guide based on empirical data, not a limit imposed by the standard.

RS-422 specifies the electrical characteristics of a single balanced signal. The standard was written to be referenced by other standards that specify the complete DTE/DCE interface for applications that require a balanced voltage circuit to transmit data. These other standards would define protocols, connectors, pin assignments and functions. Standards such as EIA-530 (DB-25 connector) and EIA-449 (DC-37 connector) use RS-422 electrical signals. Some RS-422 devices have 4 screw terminals for pairs of wire, with one pair used for data in each direction.

RS-422 cannot implement a true multi-point communications network, such as with RS-485, since there can be only one driver on each pair of wires. However, one driver can fan-out to up to ten receivers.

RS-422 can interoperate with interfaces designed to MIL-STD-188-114B, but they are not identical. RS-422 uses a nominal 0 to 5-volt signal, while MIL-STD-188-114B uses a signal symmetric about 0 V. However, the tolerance for common-mode voltage in both specifications allows them to interoperate. Care must be taken with the termination network.

RS-423 is a similar specification for unbalanced signaling.

When used in relation to communications wiring, RS-422 wiring refers to cable made of 2 sets of twisted pair, often with each pair being shielded, and a ground wire. While a double-pair cable may be practical for many RS-422 applications, the RS-422 specification only defines one signal path and does not assign any function to it. Any complete cable assembly with connectors should be labeled with the specification that defined the signal function and mechanical layout of the connector, such as RS-449.

== Applications ==
One of the most widespread uses of RS-422 was on the early Macintosh computers. This was implemented in a multi-pin connector that had enough pins to support the majority of the common RS-232 pins; the first models used a 9-pin D connector, but this was quickly replaced by a mini-DIN-8 connector starting with the Macintosh Plus. The ports could be put into either RS-232 or RS-422 mode, which changes the behavior of some of the pins while turning others on or off completely. These connectors are used to support RS-232 devices like modems, AppleTalk networking, RS-422 printers, and other peripherals. Two such ports were part of early Apple Macintosh series designs until they were replaced, along with ADB ports, by Universal Serial Bus on the iMac in 1998.

RS-422 is a common transport mechanism for RS-232 extenders. These consist of RS-232 ports on either end of an RS-422 connection.

Before hard-disk-based playout and editing systems were used, broadcast automation systems and post-production linear editing facilities used RS-422A to remotely control the players/recorders located in the central apparatus room. In most cases, the Sony 9-pin connection was used, which makes use of a DE-9 connector. This is the de facto industry standard connector for RS-422, which is still found on broadcast equipment today.

== See also ==
- Differential TTL
- List of network buses
- Fieldbus
- Profibus
