= RS-449 =

Standard for serial communication

- Communication protocol
- OSI layer: Physical layer
- IP number: Serial data over RS-422 (balanced) and RS-423 (unbalanced)
- RFC: EIA-449 (Standard Specification)
- Hardware: DC-37 primary connector, DE-9 secondary connector

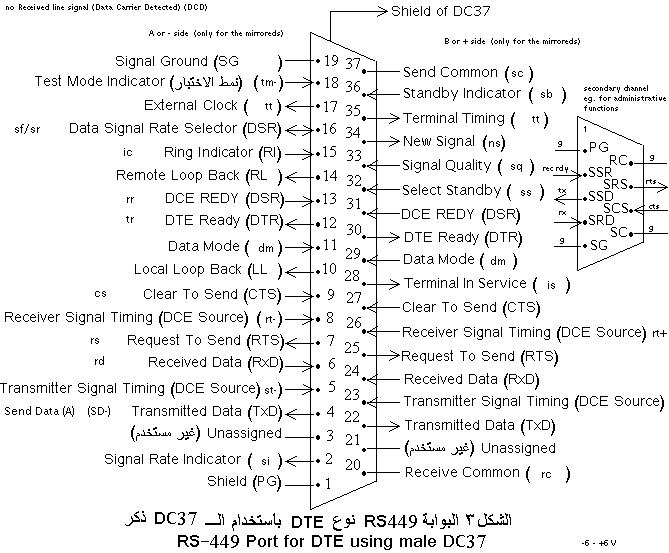
RS-449 pinout

The RS-449 specification, also known as EIA-449 or TIA-449, defines the functional and mechanical characteristics of the interface between data terminal equipment, typically a computer, and data communications equipment, typically a modem or terminal server. The full title of the standard is EIA-449 General Purpose 37-Position and 9-Position Interface for Data Terminal Equipment and Data Circuit-Terminating Equipment Employing Serial Binary Data Interchange.

449 was part of an effort to replace RS-232C, offering much higher performance and longer cable lengths while using the same DB-25 connectors. This was initially split into two closely related efforts, RS-422 and RS-423. As feature creep set in, the number of required pins began to grow beyond what a DB-25 could handle, and the RS-449 effort started to define a new connector.

449 emerged as an unwieldy system using a large DC-37 connector along with a separate DE-9 connector if the 422 protocol was used. The resulting cable mess was already dismissed as hopeless before the standard was even finalized. The effort was eventually abandoned in favor of RS-530, which used a single DB-25 connector.

== Background ==
During the late 1970s, the EIA began developing two new serial data standards to replace RS-232. RS-232 had a number of issues that limited its performance and practicality. Among these was the relatively large voltages used for signalling, +5 and -5V for mark and space. To supply these, a +12V power supply was typically required, which made it somewhat difficult to implement in a market that was rapidly being dominated by +5/0V transistor-transistor logic (TTL) circuitry and even lower-voltage CMOS implementations. These high voltages and unbalanced communications also resulted in relatively short cable lengths, nominally set to a maximum of 50 feet (15 m), although in practice they could be somewhat longer if running at slower speeds. (Note: The need for 12V to drive RS-232 often led to some complexity in early computer power supplies. For instance, in the Atari 8-bit computers, expansion devices were located on an external port, so the power supply had to feed both 5 and 12V to the machine, and then pass the 12V out though the SIO connector.)

The reason for the large voltages was due to ground voltages. RS-232 included both a protective ground and a signal ground in the standard, but did not define how these were to be implemented. It was often the case that the protective ground was left unconnected, and the signal ground was connected to ground at both ends. As a result, if there was a slight difference in ground potential at the two ends of the cable, the voltage in the signal ground pin might not be zero, and large signal voltages were needed to provide a positive signal in this case.

To address this problem, the new RS-422 and RS-423 standards used well-defined grounding that was always based on the sender's reference, and made the signal only 400 mV above or below this reference. In the case of RS-422, for instance, every signal had a second pin operating at the opposite voltage, thereby balancing the voltages and always providing a positive signal. When this process was starting, the decision was made to unbundle the mechanical aspects of the standard from the electrical, with the former becoming the RS-449 standards track.

The primary difference between RS-422 and RS-423 was that the former had a return line for every signal, while the later had a single shared signal ground. This meant that RS-422 had double the number of signal wires. Along with other changes, the number of connections began to grow, to the point where even RS-423, which was functionally similar to RS-232, no longer fit in a DB25 connector. This led to the use of the larger DC-37, but even that did not have enough pins to support RS-422, so this was "solved" by adding the additional ground wires to a separate DE-9 connector. This resulted in a "horrendous number of wires" and the conclusion in 1983 that its "success... remains to be seen."

The standard was rarely used, although it could be found on some network communication equipment. EIA-449-1 was rescinded in January 1986 and superseded by EIA/TIA-530-A, the final version EIA-449-1 was withdrawn in September 2002.

== See also ==
- Electronic Industries Alliance
- RS-485
- USB
