= EIA/TIA-662 =

TIA/EIA-662 is a 1995 telecommunications standard from the Telecommunications Industry Association, a 1988 offshoot of the EIA. The standard addresses Personal Wireless Telecommunications (PWT).

The standard is based on a microcell radio communications system that provides low-power radio access between portable equipment and the fixed network over distances of a few hundred meters. Such wireless personal telecommunications devices may be used for Wireless PBX services and for sending data in packets or over circuits. This standard is based on the Digital Enhanced Cordless Telecommunications (DECT) standard.
