= Robert Taylor (computer scientist) =

American computer scientist

Robert William Taylor
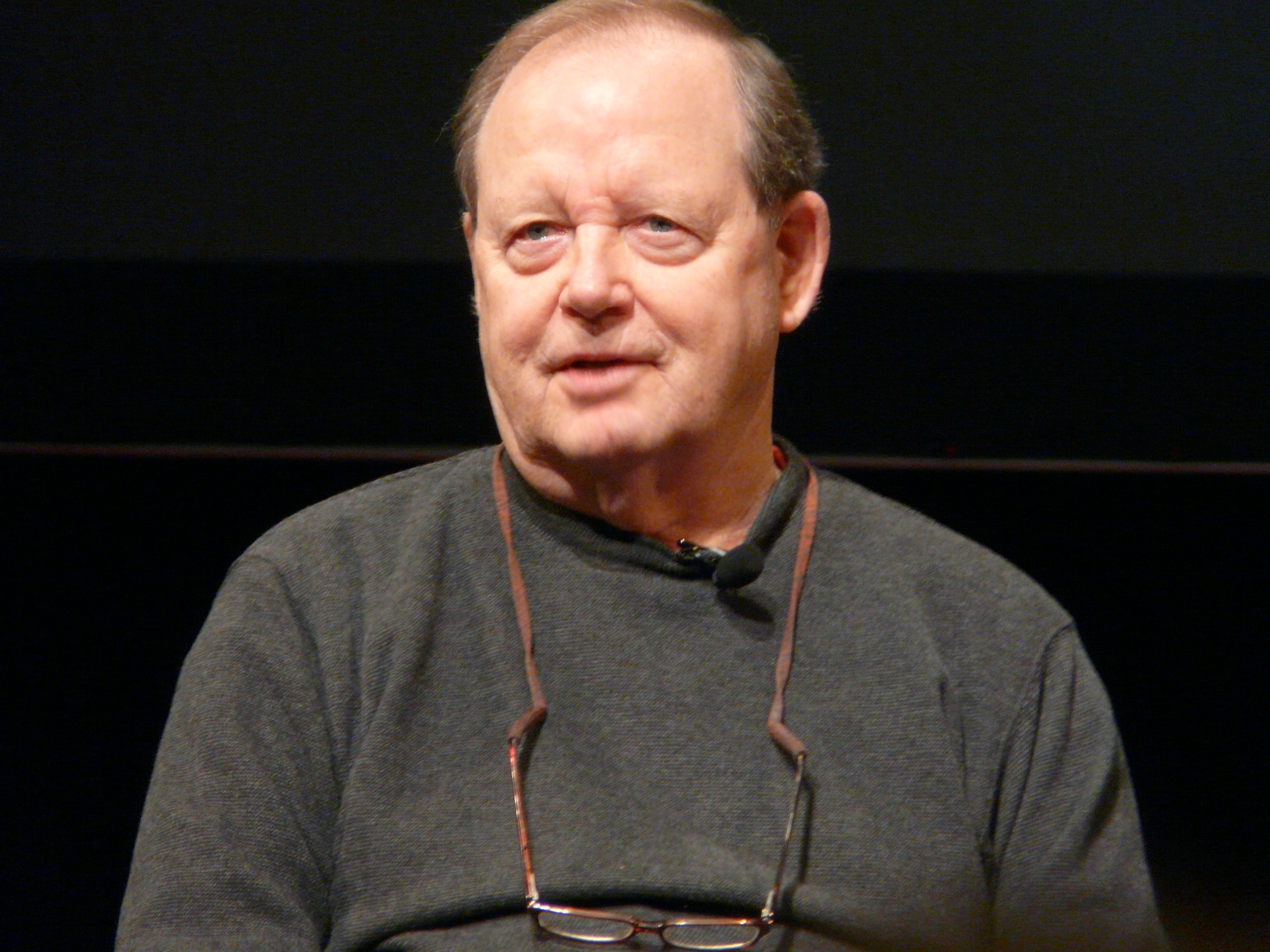
- Robert William Taylor in 2008
- Born: February 10, 1932; Dallas, Texas, United States
- Died: April 13, 2017 (aged 85); Woodside, California, United States
- Resting place: America
- Education: Southern Methodist University; University of Texas
- Known for: Internet pioneer Computer networking & Communication systems Modern personal computing
- Children: Kurt Taylor; Derek Taylor; Erik Taylor
- Awards: ACM Software Systems Award (1984); ACM Fellow (1994); National Medal of Technology and Innovation (1999); Charles Stark Draper Prize (2004); Computer History Museum Fellow (2013)
- Scientific career
- Fields: Computer science
- Workplaces: ARPA; Xerox PARC; Digital Equipment Corporation

Robert William Taylor (February 10, 1932 – April 13, 2017), known as Bob Taylor, was an American Internet pioneer, who led teams that made major contributions to the personal computer, and other related technologies. He was director of ARPA's Information Processing Techniques Office from 1965 through 1969, founder and later manager of Xerox PARC's Computer Science Laboratory from 1970 through 1983, and founder and manager of Digital Equipment Corporation's Systems Research Center until 1996.

Uniquely, Taylor had no formal academic training or research experience in computer science; Severo Ornstein likened Taylor to a "concert pianist without fingers", a perception reaffirmed by historian Leslie Berlin: "Taylor could hear a faint melody in the distance, but he could not play it himself. He knew whether to move up or down the scale to approximate the sound, he could recognize when a note was wrong, but he needed someone else to make the music."

His awards include the National Medal of Technology and Innovation and the Draper Prize. Taylor was known for his high-level vision: "The Internet is not about technology; it's about communication. The Internet connects people who have shared interests, ideas and needs, regardless of geography."

== Early life ==
Robert W. Taylor was born in Dallas, Texas, in 1932. His adoptive father, Rev. Raymond Taylor, was a Methodist minister who held degrees from Southern Methodist University, the University of Texas at Austin and Yale Divinity School. The family (including Taylor's adoptive mother, Audrey) was highly itinerant during Taylor's childhood, moving from parish to parish. Having skipped several grades as a result of his enrollment in an experimental school, he began his higher education at Southern Methodist University at the age of 16 in 1948; while there, he was "not a serious student" but "had a good time."

Taylor then served a stint in the United States Naval Reserve during the Korean War (1952–1954) at Naval Air Station Dallas before returning to his studies at the University of Texas at Austin under the GI Bill. At UT he was a "professional student," taking courses for pleasure. In 1957, he earned an undergraduate degree in experimental psychology from the institution with minors in mathematics, philosophy, English and religion.

He subsequently earned a master's degree in psychology from Texas in 1959 before electing not to pursue a PhD in the field. Reflecting his background in experimental psychology and mathematics, he completed research in neuroscience, psychoacoustics and the auditory nervous system as a graduate student. According to Taylor, "I had a teaching assistantship in the department, and they were urging me to get a PhD, but to get a PhD in psychology in those days, maybe still today, you have to qualify and take courses in abnormal psychology, social psychology, clinical psychology, child psychology, none of which I was interested in. Those are all sort of in the softer regions of psychology. They're not very scientific, they're not very rigorous. I was interested in physiological psychology, in psychoacoustics or the portion of psychology which deals with science, the nervous system, things that are more like applied physics and biology, really, than they are what normally people think of when they think of psychology. So I didn't want to waste time taking courses in those other areas and so I said I'm not going to get a PhD."

After leaving Texas, Taylor taught math and coached basketball for a year at Howey Academy, a co-ed prep school in Florida. "I had a wonderful time but was very poor, with a second child — who turned out to be twins — on the way," he recalled.

Taylor took engineering jobs with aircraft companies at better salaries. He helped to design the MGM-31 Pershing as a senior systems engineer for defense contractor Martin Marietta (1960–1961) in Orlando, Florida.

In 1962, after submitting a research proposal for a flight control simulation display, he was invited to join NASA's Office of Advanced Research and Technology as a program manager assigned to the crewed flight control and display division.

== Computer career ==
Taylor worked for NASA in Washington, D.C. while the Kennedy administration was backing research and development projects such as the Apollo program for a crewed moon landing. In late 1962 Taylor met J. C. R. Licklider, who was heading the new Information Processing Techniques Office (IPTO) of the Advanced Research Project Agency (ARPA) of the United States Department of Defense. Like Taylor, Licklider had specialized in psychoacoustics during his graduate studies. In March 1960, he published “Man–Computer Symbiosis”, an article that envisioned new ways to use computers. This work was an influential roadmap in the history of the internet and the personal computer, and greatly influenced Taylor.

During this period, Taylor also became acquainted with Douglas Engelbart at the Stanford Research Institute in Menlo Park, California. He directed NASA funding to Engelbart's studies of computer-display technology at SRI that led to the computer mouse. The public demonstration of a mouse-based user interface was later called "the Mother of All Demos." At the Fall 1968 Joint Computer Conference in San Francisco, Engelbart, Bill English, Jeff Rulifson and the rest of the Human Augmentation Research Center team at SRI showed on a big screen how he could manipulate a computer remotely located in Menlo Park, while sitting on a San Francisco stage, using his mouse.

=== ARPA ===
In 1965, Taylor moved from NASA to IPTO, first as a deputy to Ivan Sutherland (who returned to academia shortly thereafter) to fund large programs in advanced research in computing at major universities and corporate research centers throughout the United States. Among the computer projects that ARPA supported was time-sharing, in which many users could work at terminals to share a single large computer. Users could work interactively instead of using punched cards or punched tape in a batch processing style. Taylor's office in the Pentagon had a terminal connected to time-sharing at Massachusetts Institute of Technology, a terminal connected to the Berkeley Timesharing System at the University of California, Berkeley, and a third terminal to the System Development Corporation in Santa Monica, California. He noticed each system developed a community of users, but was isolated from the other communities.

Taylor hoped to build a computer network to connect the ARPA-sponsored projects together, if nothing else, to let him communicate to all of them through one terminal. By June 1966, Taylor had been named director of IPTO; in this capacity, he shepherded the ARPANET project until 1969. Taylor had convinced ARPA director Charles M. Herzfeld to fund a network project earlier in February 1966, and Herzfeld transferred a million dollars from a ballistic missile defense program to Taylor's budget. Taylor hired Larry Roberts from MIT Lincoln Laboratory to be its first program manager. Roberts first resisted moving to Washington DC, until Herzfeld reminded the director of Lincoln Laboratory that ARPA dominated its funding. Licklider continued to provide guidance, and Wesley A. Clark suggested the use of a dedicated computer, called the Interface Message Processor at each node of the network instead of centralized control. At the 1967 Symposium on Operating Systems Principles, a member of Donald Davies' team (Roger Scantlebury) presented their research on packet switching and suggested it for use in the ARPANET. ARPA issued a request for quotation (RFQ) to build the system, which was awarded to Bolt, Beranek and Newman (BBN). ATT Bell Labs and IBM Research were invited to join, but were not interested. At a pivotal meeting in 1967 most participants resisted testing the new network; they thought it would slow down their research.

In 1968, Licklider and Taylor published "The Computer as a Communication Device". The article laid out the future of what the Internet would eventually become. It began with a prophetic statement: "In a few years, men will be able to communicate more effectively through a machine than face to face."

Beginning in 1967, Taylor was sent by ARPA to investigate inconsistent reports coming from the Vietnam War. Only 35 years old, he was given an identification card with the military rank equivalent to his civilian position (brigadier general), thus ensuring protection under the Geneva convention if he were captured. Over the course of several trips to the area, he established a computer center at the Military Assistance Command, Vietnam base in Saigon. In his words: "After that the White House got a single report rather than several. That pleased them; whether the data was any more correct or not, I don't know, but at least it was more consistent." The Vietnam project took him away from directing research, and "by 1969 I knew ARPANET would work. So I wanted to leave."

The election of Richard Nixon to the presidency and ongoing tensions with Roberts (who, despite maintaining a putatively cordial relationship with Taylor, resented his lack of research experience and appointment to the IPTO directorship) also factored in his decision to leave ARPA. For about a year, he joined Sutherland and David C. Evans at the University of Utah in Salt Lake City, where he had funded a center for research on computer graphics while at ARPA.

Unable to acclimate to the Church of Jesus Christ of Latter-day Saints-dominated milieu, Taylor moved to Palo Alto, California in 1970 to become associate manager of the Computer Science Laboratory (CSL) at Xerox Corporation's new Palo Alto Research Center.

=== Xerox ===
Although Taylor played an integral role in recruiting scientists for the laboratory from the ARPA network, physicist and Xerox PARC director George Pake felt that he was an unsuitable candidate to manage the group because he lacked a relevant doctorate and subsequent experience in academic research. While Taylor eschewed a Pake-proposed research program in computer graphics in favor of largely administering the day-to-day operations of the laboratory from its inception, he acquiesced to the appointment of BBN scientist and ARPA network acquaintance Jerome I. Elkind as titular CSL manager in 1971.

Technologies developed at PARC under Taylor's aegis focused on reaching beyond ARPANET to develop what has become the Internet, and the systems that support today's personal computers. They included:

- Powerful personal computers (including the Xerox Alto and later "D-machines") with windowed displays and graphical user interfaces that inspired the Apple Lisa and Macintosh. The Computer Science Laboratory built the Alto, which was conceived by Butler Lampson and designed mostly by Charles P. Thacker, Edward M. McCreight, Bob Sproull and David Boggs. The Learning Research Group of PARC's Systems Science Laboratory (led by Alan Kay) added the software-based "desktop" metaphor.
- Ethernet, which networks local computers within a building or campus; and PARC Universal Packet (PUP) an early protocol for internetworking that connected the Ethernet to the ARPANET, which was a forerunner to TCP/IP and the Internet. PUP was primarily designed by Robert Metcalfe, David Boggs, Charles P. Thacker, Butler Lampson and John Shoch.
- The electronics and software that led to the laser printer (spearheaded by optical engineer Gary Starkweather, who transferred from Xerox's Webster, New York laboratory to work with CSL) and the Interpress page description language that allowed John Warnock and Chuck Geschke to found Adobe Systems.
- "What-you-see-is-what-you-get" (WYSIWYG) word-processing programs, as exemplified by Bravo, which Charles Simonyi took to Microsoft to serve as the basis for Microsoft Word.
- SuperPaint, a pioneering graphics program and framebuffer computer system developed by Richard Shoup. The software was written in consultation with future Pixar co-founder Alvy Ray Smith, who could not secure an appointment at PARC and was retained as an independent contractor. Although Shoup received a special Emmy Award (shared with Xerox) in 1983 and an Academy Scientific Engineering Award (shared with Smith and Thomas Porter) in 1998 for his achievement, program development continued to be marginalized by Taylor and PARC, ultimately precipitating Shoup's departure in 1979.

Belying his lack of programming and engineering experience, Taylor was noted for his strident advocacy of Licklider-inspired distributed personal computing and his ability to maintain collegial and productive relationships between what was widely perceived as the foremost array of the epoch's leading computer scientists. This was exemplified by a weekly staff meeting at PARC (colloquially known as "Dealer" after Edward O. Thorp's Beat the Dealer) in which staff members would lead a discussion about myriad topics. They would sit in a circle of beanbag chairs and open debate was encouraged. According to Kay, the meeting "was part of the larger ARPA community to learn how to argue to illuminate rather than merely to win. ... The main purposes of Dealer -- as invented and implemented by Bob Taylor -- were to deal with how to make things work and make progress without having a formal manager structure. The presentations and argumentation were a small part of a deal session (they did quite bother visiting Xeroids). It was quite rare for anything like a personal attack to happen (because people for the most part came into PARC having been blessed by everyone there -- another Taylor rule -- and already knowing how 'to argue reasonably')."

Throughout his tenure at PARC, Taylor frequently clashed with Elkind (who held budgetary responsibility for new projects but found his managerial authority undercut by Taylor's intimate relationships with the research staff) and Pake (who did not countenance Taylor's outsized influence in the laboratory and deprecatory attitude toward Xerox's physics research program, then directly overseen by Pake); as a result, he was not officially invited to the company's "Futures Day" demo (marking the public premiere of the Alto) in Boca Raton, Florida in 1977. However, after one of Elkind's extended absences (stemming from his ongoing involvement in other corporate and government projects), Taylor became the manager of the laboratory in early 1978.

In 1983, physicist and integrated circuit specialist William J. Spencer became director of PARC. Spencer and Taylor disagreed about budget allocations for CSL (exemplified by the ongoing institutional divide between computer science and physics) and CSL's frustration with Xerox's inability to recognize and use what they had developed. In a heated discussion led by Elkind and above, it was implied that Taylor without his PhD might be let go he said he would do them one better, "I quit", he said. After leaving the building, all of Taylor's scientists were brought into a large meeting room and were informed of his departure from PARC. A scientist stood up and said that they had better get him back and that if they didn't he would never set foot in this place again. Then, one by one, they all stood up and walked out. This sort of loyalty was unprecedented. By the end of the year, Taylor and most of the researchers at CSL who had left Xerox were rejoined again, this time in a Computer Corporation, not a copier company. A coterie of leading computer scientists (including Licklider, Donald Knuth and Dana Scott) expressed their displeasure with Xerox's decision not to retain Taylor in a letter-writing campaign to CEO David Kearns.

=== DEC SRC ===
Taylor was hired by Ken Olsen of Digital Equipment Corporation, and formed the Systems Research Center in Palo Alto. Many of the former CSL researchers came to work at SRC. Among the projects at SRC were the Modula-3 programming language; the snoopy cache, used in the DEC Firefly multiprocessor workstation; the first multi-threaded Unix system; the first User Interface editor; the AltaVista search engine and a networked Window System.

== Retirement and death ==
Taylor retired from DEC in 1996. Following his divorce (coinciding with his departure from Xerox), he lived in a secluded house in Woodside, California.

In 2000, he voiced two concerns about the future of the Internet: control and access. In his words:

There are many worse ways of endangering a larger number of people on the Internet than on the highway. It's possible for people to generate networks that reproduce themselves and are very difficult or impossible to kill off. I want everyone to have the right to use it, but there's got to be some way to insure responsibility.

Will it be freely available to everyone? If not, it will be a big disappointment.

On April 13, 2017, he died at his home in Woodside, California. His son said he had suffered from Parkinson's disease and other health problems.

== Awards ==
In 1984, Taylor, Butler Lampson, and Charles P. Thacker received the ACM Software Systems Award "for conceiving and guiding the development of the Xerox Alto System demonstrating that a distributed personal computer system can provide a desirable and practical alternative to time-sharing." In 1994, all three were named ACM Fellows in recognition of the same work. In 1999, Taylor received a National Medal of Technology and Innovation. The citation read "For visionary leadership in the development of modern computing technology, including computer networks, the personal computer and the graphical user interface."

In 2004, the National Academy of Engineering awarded him along with Lampson, Thacker and Alan Kay their highest award, the Draper Prize. The citation reads: "for the vision, conception, and development of the first practical networked personal computers."

In 2013, the Computer History Museum named him a Museum Fellow, "for his leadership in the development of computer networking, online information and communications systems, and modern personal computing."

== See also ==
- List of Internet pioneers
