= Richard Shoup (programmer) =

American computer scientist

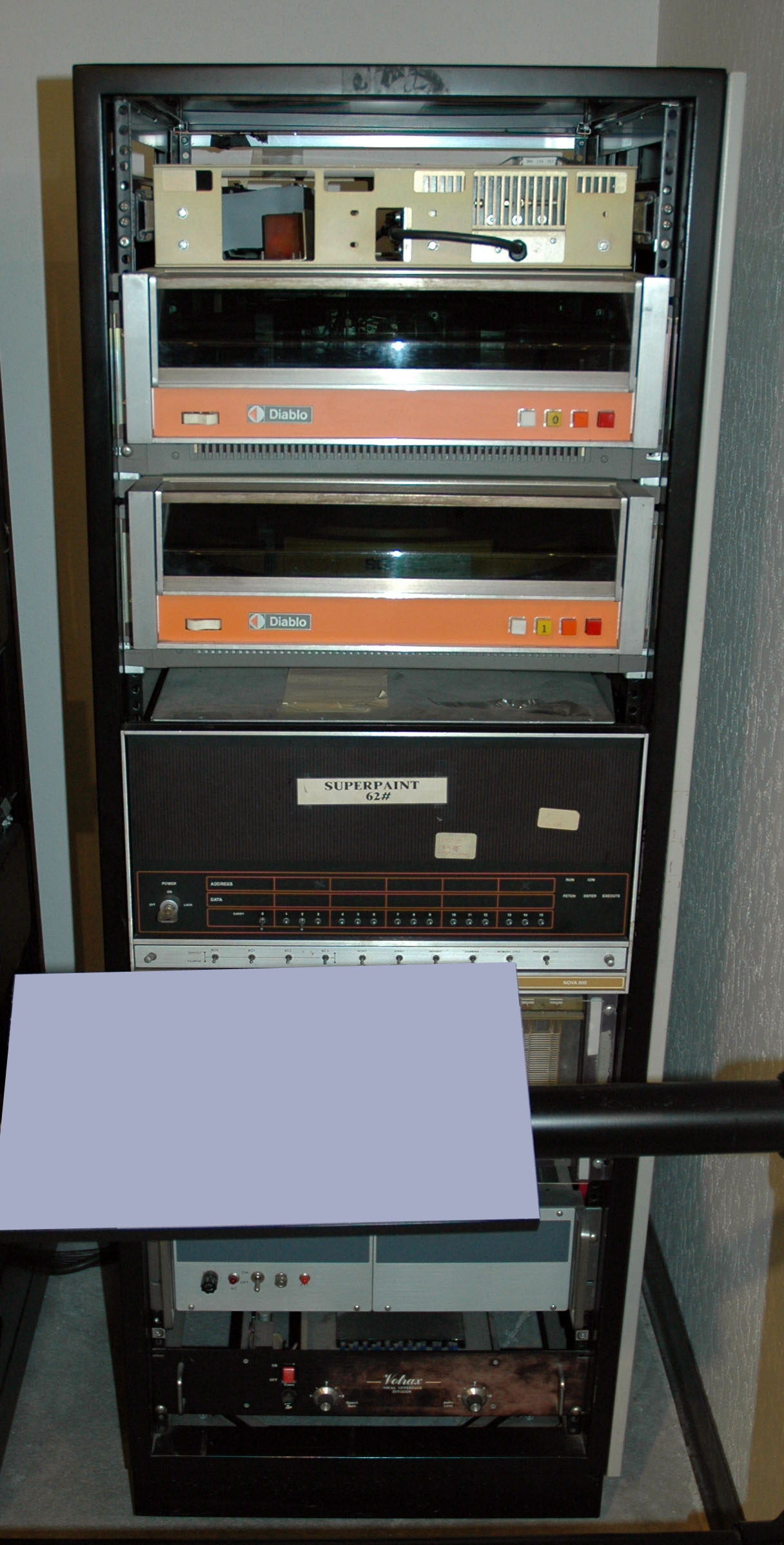
Richard Shoup's SuperPaint computer, a Data General Nova 800, at the Computer History Museum

Richard Shoup (July 30, 1943 – July 18, 2015) was an American computer scientist and entrepreneur, mainly known from his pioneering work on computer graphics and animation. Originally from Gibsonia, Pennsylvania, he last resided in San Jose, California.

He earned a B.S.E.E. and a Ph.D. in computer science from Carnegie Mellon University. His Ph.D. thesis was the first to explore programmable logic and reconfigurable hardware, now widely used in computers and consumer electronics.

In 1973, while working as one of the first employees at the Xerox Palo Alto Research Center, he built SuperPaint, one of the first image editing programs. Future Pixar cofounder Alvy Ray Smith contributed to program development as an independent contractor.

Although he had been directly recruited by Robert Taylor following the collapse of the Berkeley Computer Corporation, Shoup's interests in video graphics and color, pixel-based imaging clashed with the office of the future research program cultivated by Taylor and Butler Lampson, ultimately precipitating his departure from Xerox. In 1979, he co-founded Aurora Systems, a company that was an early producer of digital animation hardware and software. He received a special Emmy Award (shared with Xerox) in 1983 and an Academy Scientific Engineering Award (shared with Smith and Thomas Porter) in 1998 for his work on SuperPaint.

During the 1990s, he was a member of the research staff at Interval Research Corporation in Palo Alto. From 2000 until his death, he was an associate at the Boundary Institute for the Study of Foundations, a nonprofit organization involved in research into physical sciences and parapsychology.

A musician in his spare time, Shoup played jazz trombone for many years in various big bands throughout the San Francisco Bay Area.

Shoup died from lung cancer on July 18, 2015.
