= SDS 9 Series =

Backward compatible line of transistorized computers

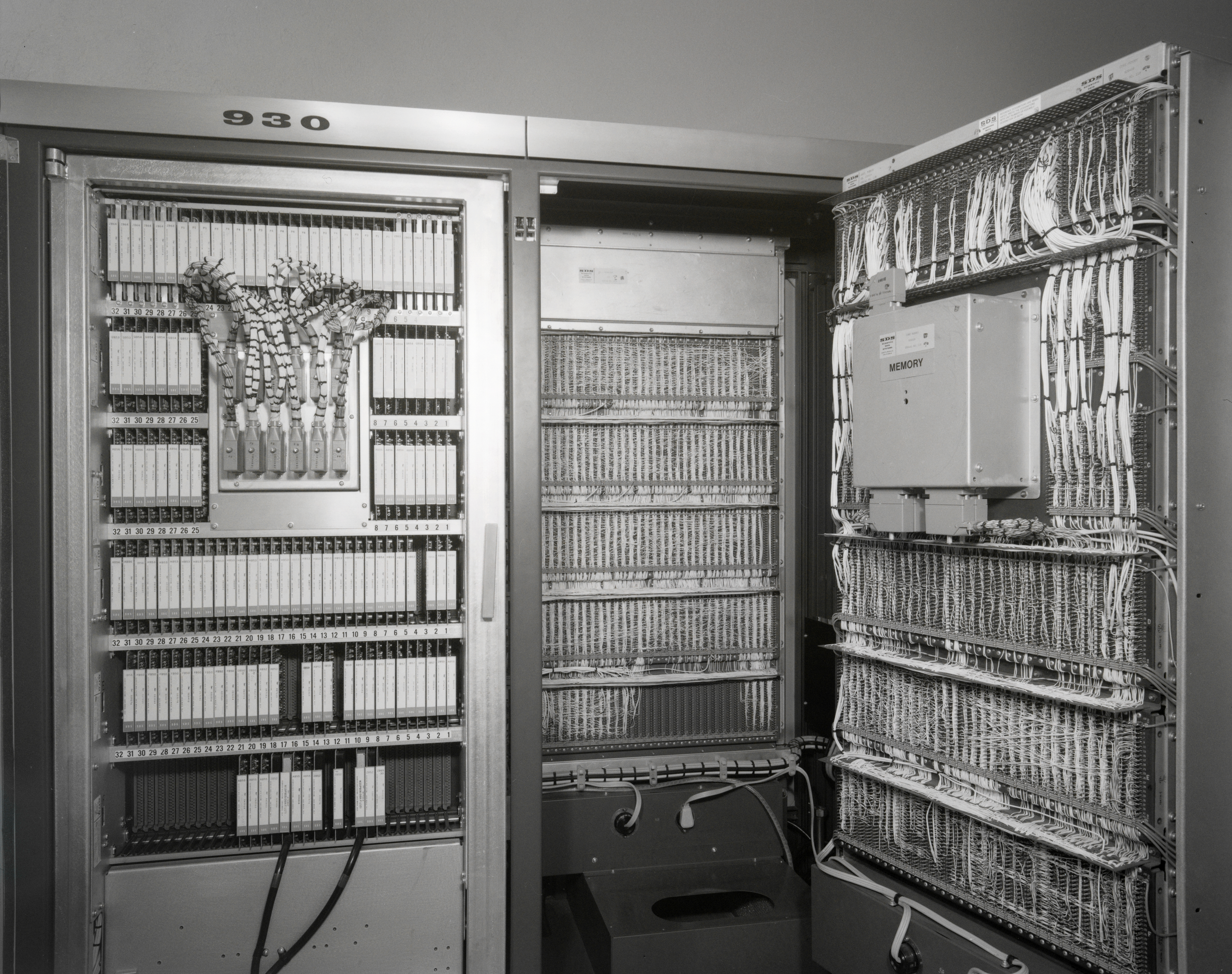
SDS 930 at Swissair, 1966

The SDS 9 Series computers are a backward compatible line of transistorized computers produced by Scientific Data Systems in the 1960s and 1970s. This line includes the SDS 910, SDS 920, SDS 925, SDS 930, SDS 940, and the SDS 945. The SDS 9300 is an extension of the 9xx architecture. The 1965 SDS 92 is an incompatible 12-bit system built using monolithic integrated circuits.

The 910 and 920 were first shipped in August, 1962. The 9300 was announced in June, 1963. The 925 and 930 were announced in 1964. The 940 was announced in 1965, and the 945 in 1968.

The 9 series was replaced by the SDS Sigma series.

== General description ==
All systems are 24-bit single address machines. Programmer-accessible registers are A (accumulator), B (extension), X (index), and P (program counter—14 bits), plus an overflow indicator. The 9300 has three index registers X1 through X3 which can be used as base registers to allow access to memory above 16K words. The W and Y registers are used for input/output.

Maximum address space is 2^{14} or 16,384 words (16 KW—64 K char) on the 910 and 920. The 9300 and 930 support up to 32K (128 K char), and the 940 and 945 support up to 64K (256 K char), although the method for accessing the memory above 16K differs.

=== Data formats ===
Fixed-point data is 24-bit, two's complement, big-endian.

Floating-point is implemented in software using "programmed operators", except on the SDS 9300 which has hardware floating-point. All floating-point numbers are stored as 48-bit double words. Single precision has a 24-bit signed fraction and a 9-bit signed exponent, double precision has a 39-bit fraction and a 9-bit exponent. Both the exponent and the fraction are stored in big-endian twos-complement format. The binary point is assumed to be immediately left of the high-order bit of the fraction. The value of the number is F*2^{E}, where F is the fraction and E is the exponent.

The floating-point formats are:

Double-precision floating-point
    +-+-----------------------+
    |±| Fraction              | high-order word
    +-+-----------+-+---------+
    | frac(cont)  |±|exponent | low-order word
    +-------------+-+---------+
bit  0             1         2
                   5         3
High-order word:
  bit   0    fraction sign
  bits  1–23 high-order part of fraction 
Low-order word:
  bits  0–14 low-order part of fraction 
  bit  15    exponent sign
  bits 16–23 exponent 

Single-precision floating-point
    +-+-----------------------+
    |±| Fraction              | high-order word
    +-+-----------+-+---------+
    | not used    |±|exponent | low-order word
    +-------------+-+---------+
bit  0             1         2
                   5         3
The format is the same as double precision except that only 24 bits of fraction are used.

=== Address generation ===
For address generation, indexing, if specified, is performed before indirection. The word at the effective indirect address is decoded as if it were an instruction (except that the instruction code is ignored), allowing an indirect address to also specify indirection or indexing. Multiple levels of indirect addressing are allowed.

=== Programmed operators ===
The programmed operator facility allows the instruction code field to indicate a call to a vector of subroutine addresses. The six bit instruction code allows up to 64 programmed operators (octal 00 through 77). If the P bit is set, an instruction code of xx is treated as a call to location 1xx (octal). The location of the POP instruction is saved in location zero. Bit zero of location zero is set to the current value of the overflow indicator and the indicator is reset. Bit 9 of location zero is set to '1'b to indicate an indirect address, allowing the programmed operator routine to indirectly access the data specified in the address of the POP instruction.

== SDS 910 ==
Main memory on the 910 is 2048 to 16384 words of magnetic-core memory with a cycle time of 8 μs. A fixed-point add instruction takes 16 μs, a fixed-point multiply takes 248 μs. Two hardware interrupts are standard with up to 896 more optional.

The instruction format for the 910 and 920 systems is as follows:

    +-+-+-+------+-+--------------+
    |0|X|P|Opcode|I|  Address     |
    +-+-+-+------+-+--------------+
                    1            2
bit  0 1 2 3    8 9 0            3

Bits 0–2 are called the "tag" 
Bit   0     is always zero.
Bit   1     '1'b indicates that the operand address is to be indexed.
Bit   2     '1'b indicates that this instruction 
            is a programmed operator (POP).
Bits  3–8   is the instruction code or programmed-operator id.
Bit   9     '1'b indicates that the operand address shall be indirected
            (indexing preceding indirecting), potentially recursively.
Bits 10–23  Contain the operand address.

The SDS 910 weighed about 900 pounds (410 kg).

== SDS 920 ==
Main memory on the 920 is 4096 to 16384 words of magnetic core memory. The fixed-point add time is the same as the 910 (16 μs), but the fixed-point multiply is roughly twice as fast at 128 μs. The 920 can have up to 1024 priority interrupts.

The 920 weighed about 1,000 pounds (450 kg).

== SDS 930 ==
The 930 offers a "memory extension system" that allows addressing more than 16284 words. Two 3-bit "Extend Memory Registers", called EM2 and EM3, are provided which can be loaded with a value to be used as the high-order three bits of the effective address. Addresses 00000_{8}–17777_{8} (the first 8192 words of memory) are always unmodified. If the high-order octal digit of the address in the instruction is two the contents of EM2 replaces the high-order digit in the effective address; when the digit is three the contents of EM3 are used.

To retain compatibility with earlier models. when the computer is started the value in EM2 is set to 2 and EM3 to 3, allowing programs to address the first 16384 words of memory. These registers can be loaded by the program.

The program loader uses the high-order bit of the instruction, ignored by all models, as a flag indicating that the instruction currently being loaded is to be relocated.

930 memory has a cycle time of 1.75 μs. A fixed-point add takes 3.5 μs, and a fixed-point multiply 7.0 μs. The priority interrupt system allows 2–38 input/output interrupts and up to 896 system interrupts.

The instruction format for the 930 system is compatible with prior systems except for the bits used for extended memory:

    +-+-+-+------+-+--+----------+
    |0|X|P|Opcode|I|EM| Address  |
    +-+-+-+------+-+--+----------+
bit  0 1 2 3    3 9 11 1        2
                    01 2        3
Bits 10 and 11 specify either no extended memory
 (EM='00'b—references first 8K words of memory)
or prepend the contents of
 EM2 (EM='10'b) or
 EM3 (EM='11'b)
 to form the effective address.

== SDS 940 ==
The 940 adds modes of operation to support multiple users. The operating mode of previous models is renamed normal mode. A new monitor mode limits access to input/output and certain privileged instructions. A user mode is used to run users' application programs.

A set of memory map registers is used to map virtual addresses to physical. There are eight memory map registers, each mapping 2K words, to provide an address space of 16K.

The instruction format for normal mode is the same as for the 930. Addressing differs between user mode and monitor mode.

SDS 940 user mode instruction format:
    +-+-+-+------+-+---+---------+
    |U|X|P|Opcode|I|Blk| Address |
    +-+-+-+------+-+---+---------+
bit  0 1 2 3    3 9 1   1       2
                    0   3       3
Bit 0 is ignored in user mode unless bit position 2 (P)
indicates that this is a programmed operator.  
In this case a '1'b in bit position 0 indicates that this is a "system POP", or "SYSPOP", instead of a standard programmed operator.

In user mode bit positions 10–12 "constitute a virtual memory block number", that is specify a memory map register, and bits 13–23 "specify a location within the virtual memory block."
The contents of the memory map register are prepended to instruction bits 13–23 to form the effective address.

=== Memory map ===
The 940 accesses memory through a memory map (Note: The use of memory map registers was carried forward to the 32-bit Sigma computers.) to provide virtual memory. The map formats differ slightly between a user memory map and a monitor memory map.

For programs running in user mode, the high-order three bits of the address field of an instruction serve as an index to an array of eight registers (R0–R7). (Note: Physically the memory map is contained in two 24-bit registers RL1 and RL2, each of which is set and cleared as a unit.) Each register contains a 5-bit value (R_{n}) which is prepended to the low-order 11 bits of the instruction address field to form the 16-bit physical address. This divides virtual memory logically into eight blocks of 2048 words each. The registers allow access to 16K words at any one time out of a possible 32K words of physical memory. A sixth bit (P_{n}) in each register indicates a read-only block of storage. R_{n}=0 and P_{n}=1 indicates an unassigned block, and any reference causes a trap. The map registers can only be set in monitor mode.

The memory map for monitor mode is similar. There are no P bits; the R_{0}–R_{5} equivalents, called M_{0}–M_{5}, contain the read-only values 0–5, providing direct access to physical addresses 0–8K-1 (00000–17777_{8}). For addresses in the range 8K–12K-1 (20000–27777_{8}) memory extension register EM2 is used to form the physical address as it is in normal mode. For addresses 12K–16K-1 (30000–37777_{8}) the contents of memory map registers M_{6} and M_{7} are used to form the address.

The monitor can use either the monitor memory map or the user memory map, determined by the value of bit 0 of the instruction. This allows the monitor access to the user's address space.

=== System programmed operators ===
In user mode, programmed operators function the same as normal mode, accessing the user's virtual locations 100-177_{8}. The 940 also includes a facility to execute System Programmed operators (SYSPOPS), used to call monitor services. When a SYSPOP is encountered in user mode (instruction bits 0 and 2 are '1'b), the computer first enters monitor mode and then accesses the vector of instructions at the monitor's (physical) 100-177_{8}.

== SDS 945 ==
The 945 is an upgrade of the 940 time-sharing system. It was advertised as being able to "support up to 24 simultaneous users and up to 64 authorized users."

== MAGPAK ==
The MAGPAK 9446 tape drive subsystem and associated 9401 tape cartridge was developed by SDS for the SDS 900 series and announced in May 1964 Each tape drive unit consists of two independently controlled magnetic tape drives mounted on a standard 10½-inch by 19-inch panel. Data are recorded at 7.5 inches per second and 1,400 bits per inch. The 9448 Tape Control Unit connects the tape drive unit to any Series 900 system. The tape cartridge contains approximately 600 feet of Mylar tape with two independent tracks each holding approximately 1.5 million IBM characters (6 bits plus parity) yielding a capacity of approximately 4 million six bit characters per cartridge.

== Software ==
The primary operating system for the line, excluding the 940 and 945, is the MONARCH operating system. MONARCH is a single-task batch operating system. Originally resident on magnetic tape, later versions can reside on a head-per-track magnetic disk called a RAD (Rapid Access Data) File. MONARCH is not an executive system, since application programs have control of all the resources of the computer when running. Instead it is a monitor, providing job-to-job transition and supporting services to applications.

The monitor routine accepts control information which, among other things, may include a request to load and execute a specified standard system routine. The monitor performs its functions between jobs and does not exercise control over the execution of a program once that program has been loaded and the monitor has transferred control to it.
...
That portion of the monitor which remains in core memory during program execution consists of the Monitor Bootstrap Routine and the Unit Assignment Table.

Other standard system routines that are included in the monitor are:

- The MONARCH Loader
- The MONARCH update routine
- Standard input/output subroutines
- The Meta-Symbol assembler
- FORTRAN II compiler

By 1969 an ALGOL 60 compiler was available.
