= SuperPaint =

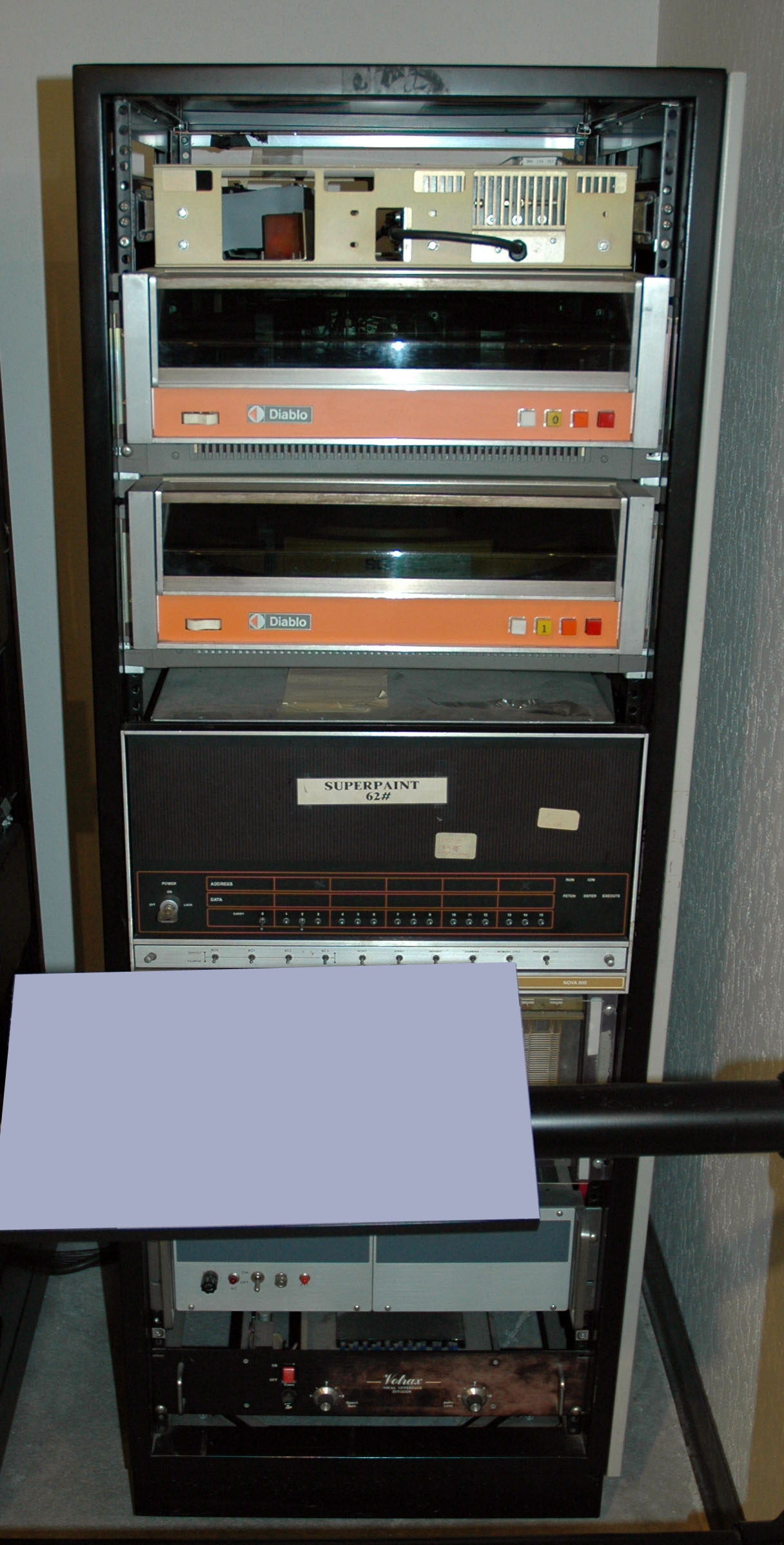
Richard Shoup's SuperPaint computer, a Data General Nova 800, at the Computer History Museum

SuperPaint was a pioneering graphics program and framebuffer computer system developed by Richard Shoup at Xerox PARC. The system was first conceptualized in late 1972 and produced its first stable image in April 1973. SuperPaint was among the earliest uses of computer technology for creative artworks, video editing, and computer animation, all of which would become major areas within the entertainment industry and major components of industrial design.

SuperPaint had the ability to capture images from standard video input or combine them with preexisting digital data. SuperPaint was also the first program to use now-ubiquitous features in common computer graphics programs such as changing hue, saturation and value of graphical data, choosing from a preset color palette, custom polygons and lines, virtual paintbrushes and pencils, and auto-filling of images. SuperPaint was also one of the first graphics programs to use a graphical user interface and was one of the earliest to feature anti-aliasing.

SuperPaint was used in the mid-1970s to make custom television graphics for KQED-TV in San Francisco, and later to make technical graphics and animations for the NASA Pioneer Venus project mission in 1978. Due to differences with management at PARC, Shoup left Xerox in 1979 to found graphics company Aurora Systems, while colleague Alvy Ray Smith went to work at New York Institute of Technology. In 1980, Smith and others joined Industrial Light & Magic, George Lucas's movie special effects firm, and this group later founded Pixar. Shoup won an Emmy Award in 1983, and an Academy Scientific Engineering Award shared with Smith and Thomas Porter in 1998, for his development of SuperPaint.

== Hardware ==
The SuperPaint system was a custom computer system built around a Data General Nova 800 minicomputer CPU and a hand-wired shift register framebuffer. This system had 311,040 bytes (303.75 KiB) of memory and was capable of storing 640 by 480 pixels of data with 8 bits of color depth. The memory was scattered across 16 circuit boards, each loaded with multiple 2-kilobit shift register chips. While workable, this design required that the total framebuffer be implemented as a 307,200 byte shift register that shifted in synchronization with the television output signal. The primary drawback to this scheme was that memory was not random access. Rather, a given position could be accessed only when the desired scan-line and pixel time rolled around. This gave the system a maximum latency of 33 ms for writing to the framebuffer.

Also included in the SuperPaint configuration was an 8-bit video digitizer, and direct conversion to standard NTSC video.

The system is now in the permanent collection of the Computer History Museum in Mountain View, California.

== See also ==
- Line Drawing System-1
