= L. Peter Deutsch =

American computer scientist (born 1946)

L Peter Deutsch
- Born: August 7, 1946 (age 80); Boston, Massachusetts, U.S.
- Education: University of California, Berkeley (Ph.D.))
- Occupations: computer scientist and composer

L Peter Deutsch (born Laurence Peter Deutsch on August 7, 1946, in Boston, Massachusetts) is an American computer scientist and composer. He is the founder of Aladdin Enterprises and creator of Ghostscript, a free software PostScript and PDF interpreter.

Deutsch's other work includes the Smalltalk implementation that inspired Java just-in-time compilation technology about 15 years later.

== Name ==
Deutsch changed his legal first name from "Laurence" to "L" on September 12, 2007. His published work and other public references before that time generally use the name L. Peter Deutsch (with a dot after the L).

== Early life ==
Deutsch's father was the physicist Martin Deutsch, a professor at MIT.

== Contributions to computer science ==
Deutsch wrote the PDP-1 Lisp 1.5 implementation and first REPL, Basic PDP-1 LISP, "while still in short pants" and finished it in 1963, when he was 17 years old. He collaborated with Calvin Mooers on the TRAC programming language and wrote its first implementation, on the PDP-1, in 1964.

From 1964 to 1967, during his study at the University of California, Berkeley, he worked with Butler Lampson and Charles P. Thacker on the Berkeley Timesharing System, which became the standard operating system for the SDS 940 mainframe that would later be used by Tymshare, NLS, and Community Memory.

Deutsch is the author of several Request for Comments (RFCs), The Eight Fallacies of Distributed Computing, and originated the Deutsch limit adage about visual programming languages.

Deutsch received a Ph.D. in computer science from the University of California, Berkeley in 1973, and has previously worked at Xerox PARC and Sun Microsystems. In 1994, he was inducted as a Fellow of the Association for Computing Machinery.

== Composer ==
After auditing undergraduate music courses at Stanford University, in January 2009, he entered the postgraduate music program at California State University, East Bay, and was awarded a Master of Arts (M.A.) in March 2011. As of mid-2011, he has had six compositions performed at public concerts, and now generally identifies himself as a composer rather than a software developer or engineer.

== Literature ==
Some stories about him are included in the book Hackers: Heroes of the Computer Revolution. An interview with him is printed in Coders at Work. Bjarne Stroustrup attributes to Deutsch the epigraph of Chapter 4 of The C++ Programming Language -- "To iterate is human, to recurse is divine."
