= David Boggs =

American electrical engineer (1950–2022)

- Born: June 17, 1950; Washington, D.C., U.S.
- Died: February 19, 2022 (aged 71); Stanford, California, U.S.
- Education: Princeton University (B.S.E.); Stanford University (Ph.D.)
- Known for: Co-invention of Ethernet
- Awards: IEEE Computer Society Technical Achievement Award (1988); ACM Fellow, AAAS Fellow
- Scientific career
- Fields: Computer networking
- Workplaces: Xerox PARC

David Reeves Boggs (June 17, 1950 – February 19, 2022) was an American electrical and radio engineer who developed early prototypes of Internet protocols, file servers, gateways, network interface cards and, along with Robert Metcalfe and others, co-invented Ethernet, the most popular family of technologies for local area computer networks.

== Biography ==
David Boggs was born on June 17, 1950, in Washington, D.C., to James Boggs and Jane (McCallum) Boggs. He graduated from the city's Woodrow Wilson High School in 1968, then from Princeton University with a B.S.E. in electrical engineering in 1972.

He joined the Xerox PARC research staff, where he met Robert Metcalfe, who was debugging an Interface Message Processor interface for the PARC systems group. Boggs, an amateur radio operator with the call sign WA3DBJ, recognized similarities between Metcalfe's theories and radio broadcasting technologies and joined his project. According to The Economist, "the two would co-invent Ethernet, with Mr Metcalfe generating the ideas and Mr Boggs figuring out how to build the system."

In 1973, they built several Ethernet interfaces for the Xerox Alto, an early personal computer. Xerox filed a patent application on March 31, 1975, naming Metcalfe, Boggs, Chuck Thacker, and Butler Lampson as inventors. After 18 months of work, the published Ethernet's seminal paper in 1976: "Ethernet: Distributed Packet Switching for Local Computer Networks”. It would be reprinted in Communications of the ACM in a special 25th-anniversary issue. For a session at the National Computer Conference in June 1976, he produced a slide from a Metcalfe sketch of Ethernet terminology which was widely reprinted. The original prototype circuit is held by the Smithsonian Institution's National Museum of American History.

While working at Xerox, Boggs went to Stanford University for graduate study in electrical engineering; he earned a master's degree in 1973 and a Ph.D. in 1982. He wrote his dissertation on "Internet Broadcasting", a concept that Steve Deering, also at Stanford, later expanded to IP multicasting.

He was also one of the developers of the PARC Universal Packet protocol architecture.

He became a fellow of the Association for Computing Machinery and received the IEEE Computer Society technical achievement award in 1988.

Boggs worked on the "Titan" project at the Digital Equipment Corporation Western Research Laboratory (DECWRL) after leaving Xerox. He worked as a consultant in Silicon Valley and co-founded LAN Media Corporation with Ron Crane. In July 2000, LMC was acquired by SBE Incorporated and then SBE was acquired by Neonode in 2007.

Boggs died of heart failure at Stanford University Medical Center in Stanford, California, on February 19, 2022, at the age of 71.

== See also ==
- List of Internet pioneers
