= Project Genie =

1964 computer research project

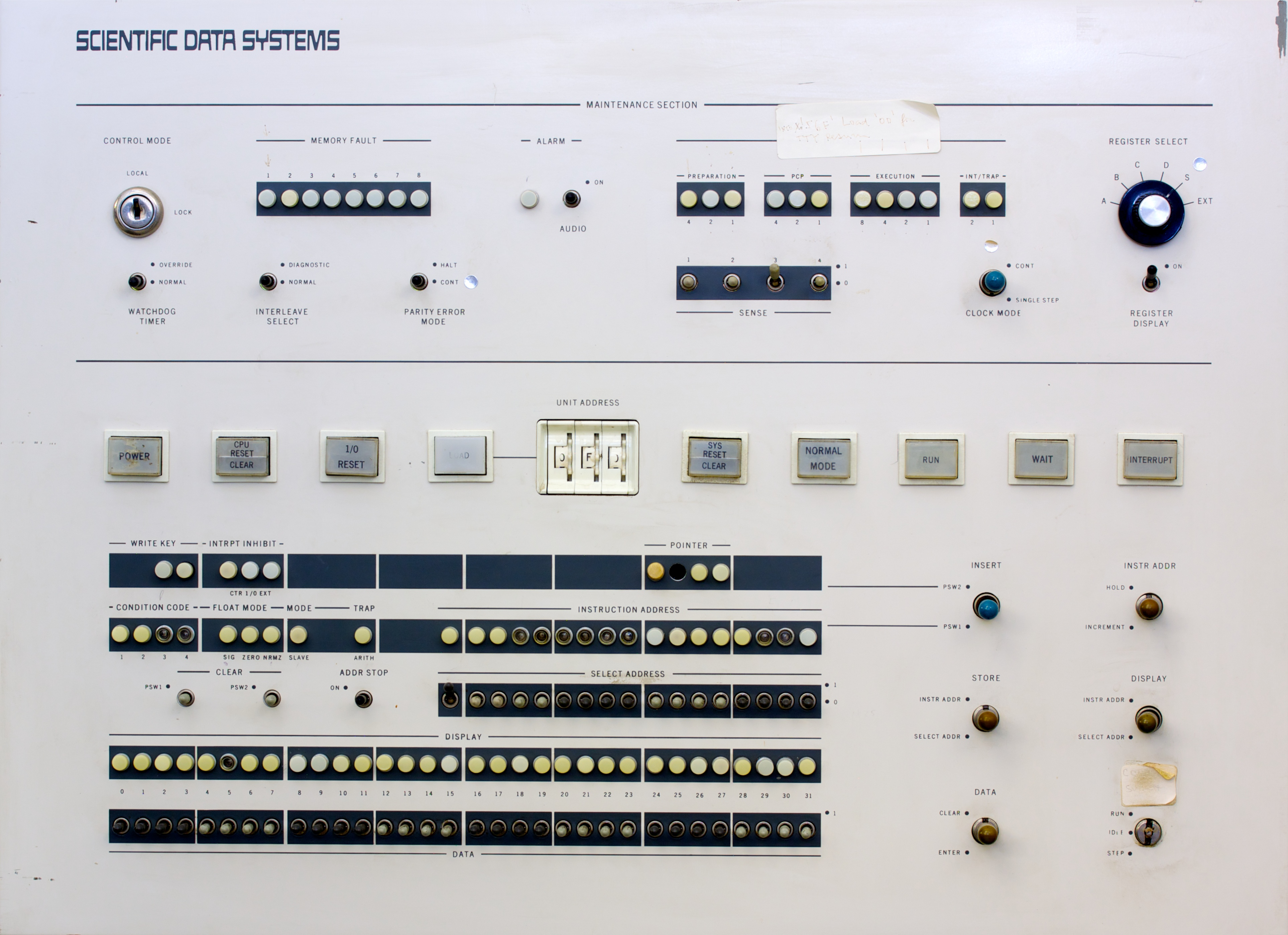
Front panel of the SDS Sigma 5 computer

Project Genie was a computer research project started in 1964 at the University of California, Berkeley. It produced an early Berkeley Timesharing System, which was then commercialized as the SDS 940. The project influenced innovations in memory paging and protected memory. It also led to the development of the BCC-500 computer system which could support 500 users, a large number at the time.

The project also led to the development of the Sigma series computers in 1966. The first internet message was then sent in October 1969 from a Sigma 7 series computer operated by Leonard Kleinrock's group at UCLA.

== History ==
Project Genie was funded by J. C. R. Licklider, the head of ARPA's Information Processing Techniques Office at that time. The project was a smaller counterpart to Massachusetts Institute of Technology's Project MAC.

The Scientific Data Systems SDS 940 was created by modifying an SDS 930 24-bit commercial computer so that it could be used for timesharing. The work was funded by ARPA and directed by Melvin W. Pirtle and Wayne Lichtenberger at UC Berkeley. Butler Lampson, Chuck Thacker, and L. Peter Deutsch were among the students involved in the project. When completed and in service, the first 940 ran reliably in spite of its array of tricky mechanical issues such as a huge disk drive driven by hydraulic arms. It served about forty or fifty users at a time and still managed to drive a graphics subsystem that was quite capable for its time.

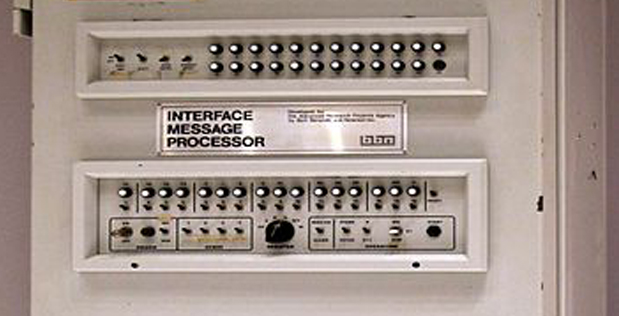
Front panel of the Sigma 7 series computer used to send the first internet message from UCLA

When SDS realized the value of the time sharing system, and that the software was in the public domain (funded by the US federal government), they came back to Berkeley and collected enough information to begin manufacturing. Because SDS manufacturing was overloaded with the 9 series production and the startup of the Sigma Series production, it could not incorporate the 940 modifications into the standard production line. Instead, production of the 940s was turned over to the Systems Engineering Department, which manufactured systems customised to user requirements. To produce a 940, the Systems Engineering Department ordered a 930 from SDS manufacturing, installed the modifications developed by the Berkeley engineers, and shipped machine to the SDS customer as a 940.

The Sigma series computers had a role in the history of the internet. The first message sent on the internet (then ARPANET) was sent by Charley Kline, a student of Leonard Kleinrock at UCLA using a Sigma 7 computer in October 1969.

== Hardware innovations ==
Project Genie pioneered several computer hardware techniques, such as commercial time-sharing which allowed end-user programming in machine language, separate protected user modes, memory paging, and protected memory. Concepts from Project Genie influenced the development of the TENEX operating system for the PDP-10, and Unix, which inherited the concept of process forking from it (Unix co-creator Ken Thompson worked on an SDS 940 while at Berkeley). An SDS 940 mainframe was used by Douglas Engelbart's OnLine System at the Stanford Research Institute and was the first computer used by the Community Memory Project at Berkeley, effectively the first computer based bulletin board system.

In 1968, Lampson also helped design a different timesharing system at Berkeley: Cal TSS for the CDC 6400 with Extended Core Storage. Lampson was only involved until 1969, but Cal TSS continued until 1971.

=== The BCC-500 system ===
Several members of project Genie such as Pirtle, Thacker, Deutsch and Lampson left UCB to form the Berkeley Computer Corporation (BCC), which produced one prototype, the BCC-500. The system was named as such because it could support 500 users, more than the typical 32 user systems of the time.

After BCC went bankrupt when its funding from the computer mainframe lessor Data Processing Financial & General (DPF&G) suddenly stopped, the BCC-500 was transferred to the University of Hawaiʻi, where Lichtenberger was a professor, and continued to be used through the 1970s. It became part of the ALOHAnet.

== Team members ==
Several BCC employees became the core of Xerox PARC's computer research group (Deutsch, Lampson and Thacker) in 1970. Lichtenberger went to the University of Hawaii, retired from there in 1981 and returned to California. He worked at Hewlett Packard and was also an early employee at Cisco Systems.

Pirtle became technical director for the ILLIAC IV project at NASA Ames Research Center.

== See also ==
- DARPA
- Berkeley Timesharing System
- Timeline of operating systems
