= Berkeley Timesharing System =

Time-sharing computer operating system

- Developer: University of California, Berkeley
- Working state: Discontinued
- Available in: English
- Supported platforms: Scientific Data Systems' SDS 940

The Berkeley Timesharing System was a pioneering time-sharing operating system implemented between 1964 and 1967 at the University of California, Berkeley. It was designed as part of Project Genie and marketed by Scientific Data Systems for the SDS 940 computer system. It was the first commercial time-sharing system which allowed general purpose programming, as well as the use of machine language.

== History ==
In the mid-1960s, most computers used batch processing: one user at a time with no interactivity. A few pioneering systems such as the Atlas Supervisor at the University of Manchester, Compatible Time-Sharing System at MIT, and the Dartmouth Time-Sharing System at Dartmouth College required large expensive machines. Implementation started in 1964 with the arrival of the SDS 930 which was modified slightly, and an operating system was written from scratch.

Students who worked on the Berkeley Timesharing System included undergraduates Chuck Thacker and L. Peter Deutsch and doctoral student Butler Lampson, supervised by Wayne Lichtenberger. The heart of the system was the Monitor (roughly what is now usually called a kernel) and the Executive (roughly what is now usually called a command-line interface).

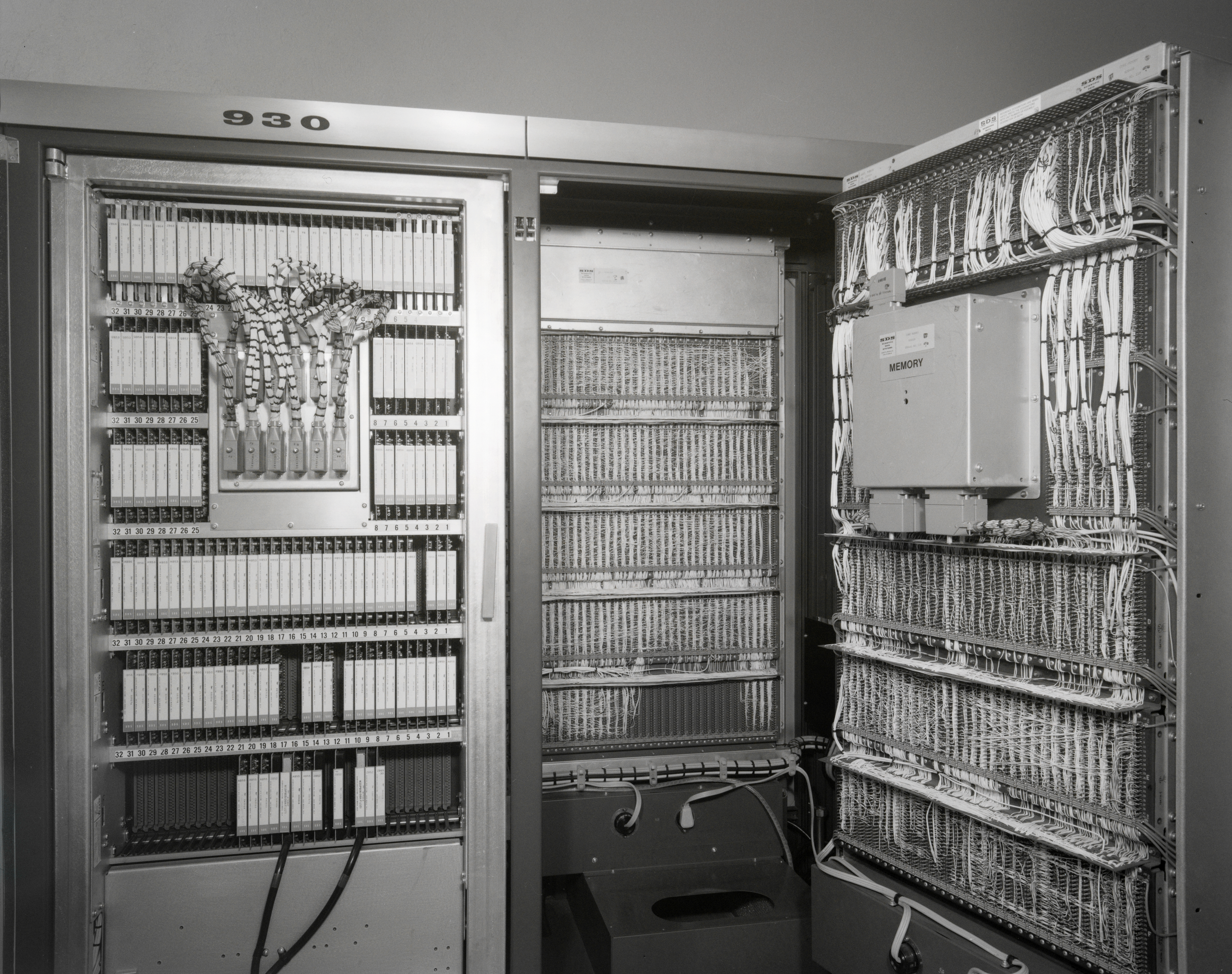
The SDS 930

When the system was working, Max Palevsky, founder of Scientific Data Systems, was at first not interested in selling it as a product. He thought timesharing had no commercial demand. However, as other customers expressed interest, it was put on the SDS pricelist as an expensive variant of the 930. By November 1967 it was being sold commercially as the SDS 940. By August 1968 a version 2.0 was announced that was just called the "SDS 940 Time-Sharing System". Other timesharing systems were generally one-of-a-kind systems, or limited to a single application (such as teaching Dartmouth BASIC). The 940 was the first to allow for general-purpose programming, and sold about 60 units: not large by today's standards, but it was a significant part of SDS' revenues.

One customer was Bolt, Beranek and Newman. The TENEX operating system for the PDP-10 mainframe computer used many features of the SDS 940 Time-Sharing System system, but extended the memory management to include demand paging.

Some concepts of the operating system also influenced the design of Unix, whose designer Ken Thompson worked on the SDS 940 while at Berkeley. The QED text editor was first implemented by Butler Lampson and L. Peter Deutsch for the Berkeley Timesharing System in 1967.

Another major customer was Tymshare, who used the system to become the USA's best known commercial timesharing service in the late 1960s. By 1972, Tymshare alone had 23 systems in operation.

== See also ==
- Timeline of operating systems
- Time-sharing system evolution
