= SDS 940 =

Machine designed to support time-sharing

- Type: Mainframe computer
- Released: 1966; 60 years ago
- Units sold: 60
- Operating system: SDS 940 Time-Sharing System, originally the Berkeley Timesharing System
- CPU: Transistor based custom 24-bit CPU
- Memory: 16 and 64 kilowords of 24 bits + parity, additional 4.5 MB swap
- Storage: 96 MB at 117 kB/s, access time 85 ms
- Graphics: Instructions of beam motion, character writing, etc, 20 characters per second. 1000-character terminals with 875-line screen.
- Connectivity: Paper tape, line printer, modem

The SDS 940 was Scientific Data Systems' (SDS) first machine designed to directly support time-sharing. The 940 was based on the SDS 930's 24-bit CPU, with additional circuitry to provide protected memory and virtual memory.

It was announced in February 1966 and shipped in April, becoming a major part of Tymshare's expansion during the 1960s. The influential Stanford Research Institute "oN-Line System" (NLS) was demonstrated on the system. This machine was later used to run Community Memory, the first bulletin board system.

After SDS was acquired by Xerox in 1969 and became Xerox Data Systems, the SDS 940 was renamed as the XDS 940.

== History ==
The design was originally created by the University of California, Berkeley as part of their Project Genie that ran between 1964 and 1969. Genie added memory management and controller logic to an existing SDS 930 computer to give it page-mapped virtual memory, which would be heavily copied by other designs. The 940 was simply a commercialized version of the Genie design and remained backwardly compatible with their earlier models, with the exception of the 12-bit SDS 92.

Like most systems of the era, the machine was built with a bank of core memory as the primary storage, allowing between 16 and 64 kilowords. Words were 24 bits plus a parity bit. This was backed up by a variety of secondary storage devices, including a 1376 kword drum in Genie, or hard disks in the SDS models in the form of a drum-like 2097 kword "fixed-head" disk or a 16384 kword traditional "floating-head" model. The SDS machines also included a paper tape punch and reader, line printer, and a real-time clock. They bootstrapped from paper tape.

A file storage of 96 MB were also attached. The line printer used was a Potter Model HSP-3502 chain printer with 96 printing characters and a speed of about 230 lines per minute.

== Software system ==
The operating system developed at Project Genie was the Berkeley Timesharing System. By August 1968 a version 2.0 was announced that was just called the "SDS 940 Time-Sharing System". As of 1969, the XDS 940 software system consisted of the following:

- Time-Sharing Monitor (what is now usually called a kernel)
- Time-Sharing Executive (what is now usually called a command-line interface)
- CAL, the Conversational Algebraic Language
- QED, a text editor
- Fortran IV
- BASIC

The minimal configuration required to run the Software System included (partial list):

- Two 16-kword core-memory modules (with multiple access).
- Two rapid-access disc (RAD) storage units and couplers (just under 4M character capacity each); optionally two more could be connected
- Disc file and coupler, with 67M characters of storage
- Magnetic tape control unit and two magnetic-tape transports (controller supports up to 8)
- Asynchronous communication controller(s), supporting up to 64 teletypewriter lines each

Additional software was available from the XDS Users' Group Library, such as a string-processing system, "SYSPOPs" (system programmed operators, which allow access to system services), CAL (Conversational Algebraic Language, a dialect of JOSS), QED (a text editor), TAP (Time-sharing Assembly Program, an assembler), and DDT, a debugging tool.

A cathode-ray tube display with 26 lines that operated DDT loader-debugger that were originally designed to operate from a teletype terminal were also available.

== Notable installations ==
Butler Lampson estimated that about 60 of the machines were sold.

- The major customer was Tymshare, who used the system to become the USA's best known commercial timesharing service in the late 1960s. By 1972 Tymshare alone had 23 systems in operation.
- Comshare, Inc, of Ann Arbor, Michigan, was the second most important corporate customer. Tymshare, Comshare and UC Berkeley collaborated in much of the operating system development for the SDS 940.
- Douglas Engelbart's Augmentation Research Center (ARC) used an SDS 940 for their oN-Line System, more commonly known as NLS. It was with this computer that he gave The Mother of All Demos in December 1968, heralding many of the concepts associated with personal computing today.
- An SDS 940 host at Stanford Research Institute was one of the four original nodes of ARPANET. It received the first message sent on the network in October 1969.
- A San Francisco counterculture community action group called Resource One and located in Project One used a donated surplus XDS 940 as described in Rolling Stone magazine in 1972.
- The Community Memory project served as an early electronic bulletin board system.

== See also ==
- SDS Sigma series
- SDS 9 Series
