= List of people associated with PARC =

Many notable computer scientists and others have been associated with the Palo Alto Research Center Incorporated (PARC), formerly Xerox PARC. They include:

- Nina Amenta (at PARC 1996–1997), researcher in computational geometry and computer graphics
- Anne Balsamo (at PARC 1999–2002), media studies scholar of connections between art, culture, gender, and technology
- Patrick Baudelaire (at PARC 1973–1979), computer graphics, image processing, WYSIWYG drawing application software (DRAW), font editing software (FRED)
- Patrick Baudisch (at PARC 2000–2001), human–computer interaction
- Daniel G. Bobrow (at PARC 1972–2017), artificial intelligence researcher
- Susanne Bødker (at PARC 1982–1983), researcher in human–computer interaction
- David Boggs (at PARC 1972–1982), computer network pioneer, coinventor of Ethernet
- Anita Borg (at PARC 1997–2003), computer systems researcher, advocate for women in computing
- Alan H. Borning (at EuroPARC 1989–1990), human–computer interaction, object-oriented programming, constraint programming, programming languages
- John Seely Brown (at PARC 1978–2000), researcher in organizational studies, chief scientist of Xerox
- Bill Buxton (at PARC 1989–1994), pioneer in human–computer interaction
- Stuart Card (at PARC 1974-2010), applied human factors in human–computer interaction
- Robert Carr (at PARC in late 1970s), CAD and office software designer
- Ed Chi (at PARC 1997–2011), researcher in information visualization and the usability of web sites
- Elizabeth F. Churchill (at PARC 2004–2006), specialist in human-computer interaction and social computing
- Lynn Conway (at PARC 1973–1982), VLSI design pioneer and transgender activist
- Franklin C. Crow (at PARC circa 1982–1990), computer graphics expert who did early research in antialiasing
- Pavel Curtis (at PARC 1983–1996), pioneer in text-based online virtual reality systems
- Doug Cutting (at PARC 1990-1994), creator of Nutch, Lucene, and Hadoop
- Emiliano De Cristofaro (at PARC 2011-2013), security and privacy researcher
- Steve Deering (at PARC circa 1990–1996), internet engineer, lead designer of IPv6
- L Peter Deutsch (at PARC 1971–1986), implementor of LISP 1.5, Smalltalk, and Ghostscript
- David DiFrancesco (at PARC 1972–1974), worked with Richard Shoup on PAINT, cofounded Pixar
- Paul Dourish (at EuroPARC 1989-1996, at PARC 1997-2000), researcher at the intersection of computer science and social science
- W. Keith Edwards (at PARC 1996–2004), researcher in human-computer interaction and ubiquitous computing
- Jerome I. Elkind (at PARC 1971–1978), head of the Computer Science Laboratory at PARC
- Clarence Ellis (at PARC 1976–1984), first African American CS PhD, pioneered computer-supported cooperative work
- David Em (at PARC 1975), computer artist, first fine artist to create a computer model of a 3d character
- Bill English (at PARC 1971–1989), co-invented computer mouse
- David Eppstein (at PARC 1989–1990), researcher in computational geometry and graph algorithms
- John Ellenby (at PARC 1975–1978), Led AltoII development, 1979 founded GRID Systems
- Matthew K. Franklin (at PARC 1998–2000), developed pairing-based elliptic-curve cryptography
- Gaetano Borriello (at PARC 1980–1987), developed Open Data Kit
- Richard Fikes (at PARC 1976-1983), leader in representation and use of knowledge in computer systems, Professor Emeritus, Stanford University
- Sean R. Garner (at PARC circa 2009– ), researcher in photovoltaics and sustainable engineering
- Charles Geschke (at PARC 1972–1980), invented page description languages, cofounded Adobe
- Adele Goldberg (at PARC 1973–1986), codesigned Smalltalk, president of ACM
- Jack Goldman (at PARC 1970–), Xerox chief scientist 1968–1982, founded PARC in 1970
- Bill Gosper (at PARC 1977–1981), founded the hacker community, pioneered symbolic computation
- Rich Gossweiler (at PARC 1997–2000), software engineer, expert in interaction design
- Rebecca Grinter (at PARC 2000–2004), researcher in human-computer interaction and computer-supported cooperative work
- Neil Gunther (at PARC 1982–1990), developed open-source performance modeling software
- Jürg Gutknecht (at PARC 1984–1985), programming language researcher, designer, with Niklaus Wirth
- Marti Hearst (at PARC 1994–1997), expert in computational linguistics and search engine user interfaces
- Jeffrey Heer (at PARC 2001-2005), expert in information visualization and interactive data analysis
- Bruce Horn (at PARC 1973–1981), member of original Apple Macintosh design team
- Bernardo Huberman (at PARC circa 1982–2000), applied chaos theory to web dynamics
- Dan Ingalls (at PARC circa 1972–1984), implemented Smalltalk virtual machine, invented bit blit
- Van Jacobson (at PARC 2006– ), developed internet congestion control protocols and diagnostics
- Natalie Jeremijenko (at PARC 1995), installation artist
- Ted Kaehler (at PARC 1972–1985), developed key systems for original Smalltalk, later Apple HyperCard, Squeak
- Ronald Kaplan (at PARC 1974–2006), expert in natural language processing, helped develop Interlisp
- Jussi Karlgren (at PARC 1991-1992), known for work on stylistics, evaluation of search technology, and statistical semantics
- Lauri Karttunen (at PARC 1987–2011), developed finite state morphology in computational linguistics
- Alan Kay (at PARC 1971–1981), pioneered object-oriented programming and graphical user interfaces
- Martin Kay (at PARC 1974–2002 ), expert on machine translation and computational linguistics
- Gregor Kiczales (at PARC 1984–2002), invented aspect-oriented programming
- Ralph Kimball (at PARC 1972–1982), designed first commercial workstation with mice, icons, and windows
- András Kornai (at PARC 1988-1991), mathematical linguist
- Butler Lampson (at PARC 1971–1983), won Turing Award for his development of networked personal computers
- David M. Levy (at PARC 1984–1999), researcher on information overload
- Jia Li (at PARC 1999–2000), researcher in computer vision and image retrieval
- Cristina Lopes (at PARC 1995–2002), researcher in aspect-oriented programming and ubiquitous computing
- Richard Francis Lyon (at PARC 1977–1981), built the first optical mouse
- Jock D. Mackinlay (at PARC 1986–2004) researcher in information visualization
- Cathy Marshall (at PARC circa 1989–2000), researcher on hypertext and personal archiving
- Edward M. McCreight (at PARC 1971–1989) co-invented B-trees
- Scott A. McGregor (at PARC 1978–1983) worked on Xerox Star, Viewers for Cedar and then Windows 1.0 at Microsoft
- Sheila McIlraith (at PARC 1997–1998), researcher in artificial intelligence and the semantic web
- Ralph Merkle (at PARC 1988–1999), invented public key cryptography and cryptographic hashing
- Diana Merry (at PARC circa 1971–1986), helped develop Smalltalk, co-invented bit blit
- Robert Metcalfe (at PARC 1972–1979), co-invented Ethernet, formulated Metcalfe's Law
- James G. Mitchell (at PARC 1971–1984), developed WATFOR compiler, Mesa (programming language), Spring (operating system), ARM RISC chip
- Louis Monier (at PARC 1983–1989), founded AltaVista search engine
- J Strother Moore (at PARC 1973-1976), text editing, Interlisp VM, string searching, theorem proving
- Thomas P. Moran (at PARC 1974–2001), founded journal Human-Computer Interaction
- James H. Morris (at PARC 1974–1982), co-invented KMP string matching algorithm and lazy evaluation
- Elizabeth Mynatt (at PARC 1995–1998), studied digital family portraits and ubiquitous computing
- Greg Nelson (at PARC 1980–1981), satisfiability modulo theories, extended static checking, program verification, Modula-3, theorem prover
- Martin Newell (at PARC 1979–1981), graphics expert who created the Utah teapot
- William Newman (at PARC 1973–1979), Graphics and HCI researcher, developed drawing and page description software
- Tina Ng (at PARC 2006–2015), expert on additive manufacture of flexible electronics
- Geoffrey Nunberg (at PARC 1987–2001), linguist known for his work on lexical semantics
- Severo Ornstein (at PARC 1976–1983), founding head of Computer Professionals for Social Responsibility
- Valeria de Paiva (at PARC 2000–2008), uses logic and category theory to model natural language
- George Pake (at PARC 1970–1986), pioneer in nuclear magnetic resonance, founding director of PARC
- Jan O. Pedersen (at PARC circa 1990-1996), researcher in search system technology and algorithms
- Peter Pirolli (at PARC 1991–2016 ), developed information foraging theory
- Calvin Quate (at PARC 1983–1994), invented the atomic force microscope
- Ashwin Ram (at PARC circa 2011–2016 ), researcher on artificial intelligence for health applications
- Trygve Reenskaug (at PARC 1978–1979), formulated model–view–controller user interface design
- George G. Robertson (at PARC circa 1988–1995), information visualization expert
- Daniel M. Russell (at PARC 1982–1993), AI and UI research; later at Apple, then at Google, where he calls himself a search anthropologist
- Eric Schmidt (at PARC 1982–1983), CEO of Google and chairman of Alphabet
- Ronald V. Schmidt (at PARC 1980–1985), computer network engineer who founded SynOptics
- Michael Schroeder (at PARC circa 1977–1985), co-invented Needham–Schroeder protocol for encrypted networking
- Bertrand Serlet (at PARC 1985–1989), led the Mac OS X team
- Scott Shenker (at PARC 1984–1998), leader in software-defined networking
- Elaine Shi (at PARC 2008-2011), researcher in cryptography, security, and blockchains
- John Shoch (at PARC 1971–1980), developed an important predecessor of TCP/IP networking
- Richard Shoup (at PARC 1971–1978), invented SUPERPAINT and the first 8 bit Frame Buffer (picture memory), 1979 cofounded Aurora
- Charles Simonyi (at PARC 1972-1981), led the creation of Microsoft Office
- Alvy Ray Smith (at PARC 1974), cofounded Pixar
- Brian Cantwell Smith (at PARC 1982–1996), invented introspective programming and studied philosophy of computation
- David Canfield Smith (at PARC 1975), invented interface icons, programming by demonstration, worked on graphical user interface, Xerox Star
- Robert Spinrad (at PARC 1978–1982), designed vacuum tube computers, directed PARC
- Bob Sproull (at PARC 1973–1977), designed early head-mounted display, wrote widely used computer graphics textbook
- Jessica Staddon (at PARC 2001–2010), information privacy researcher
- Gary Starkweather (at PARC 1970–1988), invented laser printers and color management
- Maureen C. Stone (at PARC circa 1980–1998), expert in color modeling
- Lucy Suchman (at PARC 1980–2000), researcher on human factors, cybercultural anthropology, and feminist theory
- Bert Sutherland (at PARC 1975–1981), brought social scientists to PARC
- Robert Taylor (at PARC 1970–1983), managed early ARPAnet development, founded DEC Systems Research Center
- Warren Teitelman (at PARC 1972–1984), designed Interlisp
- Shang-Hua Teng (at PARC 1991–1992), invented smoothed analysis of algorithms and near-linear-time Laplacian solvers
- Larry Tesler (at PARC 1973–1980), developed Object Pascal and Apple Newton
- Chuck Thacker (at PARC 1971–1983), chief designer of Alto, co-invented Ethernet
- John Warnock (at PARC 1978–1982), cofounded Adobe
- Mark Weiser (at PARC 1987–1999), invented ubiquitous computing
- Niklaus Wirth (at PARC 1976–1977 and 1984–1985), designed Pascal and other programming languages
- Frances Yao (at PARC 1979–1999), researcher in computational geometry and combinatorial algorithms
- Nick Yee (at PARC 2005-2012), researcher in psychology and sociology of virtual environments
- Annie Zaenen (at PARC 2001–2011), researcher on linguistic encoding of temporal and spatial information
- Lixia Zhang (at PARC 1989–1996), computer networking pioneer
