= Feminist digital humanities =

Feminist Digital Humanities is a more recent development in the field of Digital Humanities, a project incorporating digital and computational methods as part of its research methodology. Feminist Digital Humanities has risen partly because of recent criticism of the propensity of Digital Humanities to further patriarchal or hegemonic discourses in the Academy. Women are rapidly dominating social media in order to educate people about feminist growth and contributions. Research proves the rapid growth of Feminist Digital Humanities started during the post-feminism era around from the 1980s to 1990s. Such feminists’ works provides examples through the text technology, social conditions of literature and rhetorical analysis. Feminist Digital Humanities aims to identify and explore women's digital contributions as well as articulate where and why these contributions are important.

Feminist Digital Humanities highlights not only the role of women, but also feminism, and cyberfeminism in technology. Some of the research in feminist digital humanities centers on the women exclusion from histories of technology and the use of technology to promote feminist scholarship. Feminist Digital Humanities also discusses diversity, gender, and sexual issues as well as contemporary feminist awareness. It has contributed to enabling a new combination and collaboration based on women's knowledge and interpretation. Feminist Digital Humanities Collection will preserve the feminists' works, processing their efforts scholarly, thus, had been considered as the only way to represent histories and engage with the past works of feminists. The Feminist Digital Humanities Project is needed in order to discover and make sense of women's work of writings.

A list of women in the digital humanities begun by Jacqueline Wernimont makes available a compendium of women working in the field.

== History ==
Background

The early history of feminist digital humanities was uncertain to where the movement can be precisely pinpointed to its exact date, or even when digital humanities created a specific section and platform for women’s works and feminism. In "Whence Feminism? Assessing Feminist Interventions in Digital Literary Archives", Jacqueline Wernimont composed a reflection on the potentiality of a feminist analysis of digital literary archives and the cross-disciplinary instruments, where she elaborated through ideal exemplary such as the Women Writers Project (WWO) and The Orlando Project when it came to digital literary scholarship. Through her writing, she unfolds the early origin of feminist digital literary history and the birth of this feminist digital humanities movement.

Women Writers Project (WWO) and the Orlando Project began as two of the earliest feminist digital humanities efforts where feminist literary scholars gathered to speak about the existing gap in literary history dispute in the 1980s through these projects. The co-founders of Orlando, Susan Brown, Patricia Clements, and Isobel Grundy, described the prospects of the new electronic approach as a strong opportunity to alleviate the occurring marginality of women writers’ works. Their view corresponded with the founders of Women Writers Online as well where they shared that "the electronic archive appeared to be the ideal theoretical successor to the physical archive, since it assured to curb the issues of inaccessibility and dearth which had rendered women’s literary works invisible for so long".

Feminist literary scholars take these efforts earnestly as they aim to recover women’s work to visible archives as one of their longtime ambitions, due to the unsettling loss of early digital literary projects. Earhart expresses her concern that these blueprints attest a primal touch where digital literary scholarship acted as a mechanism that might be implemented to fulfill the theoretical demands of academic literature that reinstated "women, people of color, queers into the canon" at the unfortunate loss of many recovered projects of the late 20th century. Through these two projects, one can still read positive responses on the existing abundance of works under them. Susan Frairman expresses her joy at this platform as a boundless list that functions electronically filled with "history-making women". Anne Lake Prescott and Betty Travitsky processed that "editing women to edit everything available and use the Internet as an infinitely expandable archival space" in their article. They further added that running digital archives is a tenaciously productive and "grand" procedure that satisfy feminist’s preference by manifesting through the formation of an abundant storage and extraction medium for an inclusive and diversity of women writers. This movement determines to retrieve all the work made by the neglected groups because it is suggested that through that attainment, women’s past literary history can be viewed as more accurately and a whole if the missing literary works can be found again to be used as a significant resource.

Intersectional Feminism in Digital Humanities

The term intersectionality emerges from the work of Kimberlé Crenshaw in the late 1980s and it aims to revise the lack of articulation between feminists and critical antiracist practices, which have too often been addressed with either gender or race but not coextensively. Therefore, intersectionality is commonly regarded to perceive race, class, and gender as beyond entirely separate structures. Formerly described by Crenshaw, intersectionality analyzes the additional aspects of difference including sexuality and ability. Intersectionality has been progressively incorporated into the field of digital humanities.

As an outlook for scholarship in digital humanities, intersectionality advocates complex analysis and highlights differences while resisting binary logic. As new media studies are often known to be an academic dominated by apolitical white heterosexual male, a found relationship between media studies and intersectionality may create a safe and insightful space for intersectional analysis. These developed visions in new media brought attention to the ideas made by feminists, queers, and scholars of critical race theory in questioning the connection between digital media and various categories of identity, simultaneously changing the general understanding of the link between digital media, networks, and individuality. Feminism is called to be central to the identity and methodologies of digital humanities.

Intersectional feminism focuses on the dynamics that were often ignored by past movements and theories, challenging the prejudiced ideas about feminism and proposing a positive environment for women, men, and others, consequently dismantling the rigidity of a gender binary society for the benefit of all people. As intersectional feminism acknowledges the relationship between the power structures (race, class, sexuality, and abilities included), incorporating it within digital humanities practices may ensure the possibility of a fight against what should be impermissible such as normalized sexual harassment, predation, and racism within higher education institutions or organizations across the world. It may also bring positive changes within the community as a whole. Intersectional feminism provides the best guidance in ethical approaches to digital humanities and has been taken up by digital humanities scholars across a range of disciplines, which, according to Roopika Risam, offers "a viable approach to cultural criticism in the digital humanities." Risam calls for an intersectional approach to digital humanities that invites a "greater intellectual diversity in the field" through an examination of its history, learning that intersectional feminist praxis in digital humanities provides a way forward for the field to engage a diversity of people.

== Objectives ==
Media Theorist Lisa Nakamura notes that "[as] women of color acquire an increasing presence online, their particular interests which spring directly from gender and racial identifications, that is to say, those identities associated with a physical body off-line, are being addressed." Likewise, Science and Technology Studies professor Donna Haraway has also pioneered specifically feminist approaches to the study of digital humanities.

This intervention is notably crystallized in the work of FemTechNet, "an activated network of scholars, artists, and students who work on, with, and at the borders of technology, science and feminism in a variety of fields including STS, Media and Visual Studies, Art, Women’s, Queer, and Ethnic Studies". FemTechNet has collaborated on a number of projects that reflect the aims of Feminist Digital Humanities, including Wikistorming, DOCC: Distributed Open Collaborative Course, and video dialogues. Their methods emphasize distribution through networks to connect diverse institutions, nations, and fields.

Professors of Digital Humanities, Bethany Nowviskie and Miriam Posner have blogged about the structures in place that have kept women from engaging in digital humanities. There have been efforts to increase the racial representations within the field as well. These feminist digital humanities projects include #transformDH, That Camp Theory, Critical Code Studies, and Crunk Feminist Collective. Black Girls Code is a project that has recently garnered attention, with founder Kimberly Bryant receiving a Standing O-vation presented by Toyota and Oprah Winfrey.

== Contributions and Impacts of Feminist Digital Humanities in The United States (U.S.) ==
Spaces such as the liberal news sites Huffington Post, blogs such as Jezebel and Feministing to social networking media such as Facebook, Twitter and Instagram have been utilized adequately contributing to the proliferation of the use of digital media and devices in raising awareness regarding feminism. Some writers have suggested that the feminism digital movement and its impact may indicate the fourth wave of feminism in America additionally proven by the propagation of the Me Too movement. This movement is entailed with many projects under the work of feminism activists through social media in the United States ever since 2012. One of the significant contributions was a live document on Twitter initiated by a UK-based activist, Laura Bates that recorded the everyday experiences of sexism under the project called Everyday Sexism Project. She received over 25,000 responses from 15 countries that included reports on sexist jokes, workplace sexism, sexual assault and victim-blaming. This was due to the sense of injustice ascribed to the victims and those who wanted to work on gender inequality. The project was one of the efforts to bridge the gap between genders through heightening the awareness regarding the oppression caused which is one of the primary purposes of the feminism movement.

The Me Too movement was another major social transformation done to the human rights and gender equality progression where it was in protest against assault and sexual harassment against women. The hashtag #MeToo started circulating on the Internet in October 2017 introduced by an American activist, Tarana Burke in 2006 in MySpace where social media users have been utilising it to draw attention to the problems related to sexual misconduct including victim-blaming, rape enabling and putting responsibility on sexual predators. As time went by and the campaign became more impactful, it managed to shift the focus not only on gender-based harassment but also the discrimination against race, gender orientation, color, age and disability. Another driving factor for the movement was the consensus in regards to lacking reporting systems of sexual misconduct in the workplace. The allegations regarding violence and sexual harassment against women were meant to be publicized on social media such as Twitter as part of the social movement to hold the powerful men accountable for their crime with the amount of audience accumulated. One of the aims of this project was also to raise awareness regarding female survivors for other victims to be inspired by. Many prominent public figures were in favor of the movement such as Alyssa Milano, Ashley Judd and Ellen DeGeneres where they gathered in solidarity on social media to give support for Christina Blasey Ford who had admitted to being sexually assaulted during her high school years in a court hearing.

Undoubtedly, the #MeToo movement brought a huge impact in the U.S. It opened the eyes of the Americans toward severe and common sexual harassment, abuse, as well as injustice towards women. Disproportionate violence against women started entering mainstream and popular discourse. This brought about a massive awareness in them which resulted in them creating more effort to prevent sexual harassment as well as assault happening in the country. This movement also become a platform for victims of abuse and harassment to speak up their frustration and anger. later it later has created a ‘safe space’ or an environment where they can raise their emotions without fear of being invalidated. This results in a rise in women speaking out about their experience with harassment and assault, which have significantly impacted the social acceptance of such behaviors.

The #HimToo, being an extraction from the Me Too movement, was one of the hashtags that was heavily circulated on social media by the feminism digital activists in October 2018. The tagline, initially created in 2015 gained momentum when a mother professed her concern towards her son regarding being falsely accused of sexual misconduct when going on a date using the hashtag. The hashtag was not that political until further reactions on social media pioneered because of the sexual allegations that were raised during Brett Kavanaugh’s nomination in a United States court hearing. The hashtag was formerly handful for political allegiances during the 2016 United States presidential election to team up against Hillary Clinton in support of Tim Kaine and used by Donald Trump’s supporters against Hillary Clinton and Barack Obama with the hashtags of #LockHerUp followed by #HimToo. The campaign of #HimToo was repopularised with the emergence of more sexual allegations towards men. This in result has successfully increased the awareness and the relevance of sexual harassment towards men despite the criticism and backlash to it including men who fought for men’s rights confiscating the hashtag to circulate rape misconceptions regarding false accusations. The hashtag is used until this very day in an effort to amplify validation and support from the public and other female survivors towards male victims. It also brought attention to the false rape and sexual allegations made by women who wanted to frame men that they disliked.

In 2014, #NotBuyingIt campaign was part of the digital feminist movement as well in encountering the problem and stereotype of women sexual objectification. This hashtag was used in social media such as Twitter in which Twitter users mentioned the responsible product company’s Twitter account containing critique regarding the stereotype of using women as prizes/objects in commercials and refusing to buy the product. The hashtag became an opportunity for people to expand their conversations on sexist commercials, women objectification and acknowledging the power of female consumers. It was sparked by the anger of feminists and highly-aware people towards sexism in regards to Super Bowl ads which used women as accessories that had a pattern of collective viewing ritual by Americans. One of the aims of this campaign was to politicise the personal experiences of the feminists’ and make it into a bigger issue that would lead to changing the society through the change of policies, laws and many more. The hashtag was used more than 15,000 times and their postings extended to over two million social media users.

== Issues Discussed in Feminist Digital Humanities ==
Institutional Bias

One of the issues commonly discussed in the field of feminist digital humanities is the existence of institutional bias which includes race and gender-based injustices. In an article written in the Debates in the Digital Humanities, a hybrid print/digital book discussing debates emerging in the field, Wikipedia’s stand in having a "neutral point of view"’ as one of its core content policies can be problematic especially to those who wish to take their stand and voice out their opinions on its bias against women and feminism. It has also been reported in the New York Times regarding Wikipedia undermining the centrality of women authors among novelists and literature by moving notable names from the "American Novelists" category to the "American Women Novelists" category. This action does not only undercut the significance of their works but will also disregard their contribution in the world of literature as a whole.

Jennifer Redmond wrote in a WordPress post concerning the potential of an open-source software platform called Omeka as a tool to be utilized in telling the history of women’s education that emerges in various perspectives. Gender imbalance has always been a problem especially in an institutional or field that is greatly conquered by men. The late Adrianne Wadewitz, a feminist scholar and former senior Wikipedia editor worked hard to improve the quality and diversify the coverage of Wikipedia, and aspired to improve the gender gap in participation on a site in which over 90 per cent of the editors identified as male. Redmond stated in her post that it is important for women to get a seat at the table "while it’s still being set, not after the main course has been served" as equal partners and discovered that the word "table" has also been used to explain the necessity to collaborate, critique and engage in new developments.

In intersectional feminism, a more diverse and inclusive approach is applied in order to make sure that people of all colors, nationalities, abilities, genders, and social status is involved. The Feminist Digital Humanities also advocates for the minorities whose history have been erased due to the institutional bias. Issues concerning racism are also often discussed in this field like the Digital Black Feminism and indigenous women. One digital humanities project called the Warrior Women Project focuses on highlighting the women as history makers of the indigenous community. Discrimination against the Mexican Americans in 1940s Texas is also recorded in a mapping project called "Are We Good Neighbours?" with the goal to "reveal the embodiment of racism in the United States".

Online Harassment

Another issue that is discussed in feminist digital humanities is online harassment. Most women are negatively affected by being harassed online, which seeks to silence women’s voices and adversely manipulate women’s personal and professional lives. Feminist scholars regard online harassment as part of a wide range of harassing behaviors that women experience, consistent with a misogynist ideology that considers women as inferior. Online harassment happens collectively in social media platforms, where people take their rights to speak grantedly by harassing women. Misogyny and sexism are examples of online harassment that frequently happened to younger women in social media platforms especially Twitter and Instagram. These platforms increase the visibility of making harassment available to a much wider audience and enabling wide-reaching calls for others to engage in negative behaviors.

Living in the era of technology, misogyny's agenda is alive and widely spread over the internet with brutal remarks towards women. On Twitter specifically, most of the time tweets tormenting women are misogynistic and related to pornography by using tags such as rape, slut and whore. Women of colour are disproportionately affected by this online misogyny. In 2018, Amnesty international released an analysis of 228,000 tweets sent to 778 women in politics and black women were 84% more likely to be targeted with abuse and harassment. In order to dismiss this misogyny, gender-related hashtags are created and trended worldwide by the victims and relatively voice out their hardships to disclose gendered violence as well as create a space for solidarity. Other than that, millions of women and feminists march across countries to demand for equal rights. The women’s march was organized in reaction to the hyper-masculinity of Trump’s election campaign with his inappropriate attitude towards women that are against his perspectives reproductive rights. Furthermore, the Women’s Media Center (WMC) is built to serve as a platform for women to share their dissatisfaction towards the harassment that they face every day. A sub-project, a WMC Speech Project enables women to access their free speech rights and write anonymously for any categories offered in the project.

In relation to online harassment, sexism is certainly one of the most constant issues that is debated over the internet. Studies have shown that outstanding percentages of women and younger girls faced abuse online that is motivated by sex and gender discrimination. In 2012, Laura Bates established a website and set up a social media channel worldwide where victims can submit individual occurrences of sexism they had experienced, with her Everyday Sexism Project. The project received thousands of entries from all over the world, mainly the States, "A schoolgirl and a widow reported being pressured and pestered for sex. A reverend in the Church of England was repeatedly asked if there was a man available to perform the wedding or funeral service," and later collated in a book, Everyday Sexism (2014). Although the project succeeded with the power of the internet, it also has enabled a backlash. Bates received violent threats, revealing the remaining force of opposition to it. Adding to that, there is an advertisement that portrays negative influences on young girls, which may dominate their way of thinking in the future. A cereal brand, Weetabix illustrates an advertisement that implies only a boy can be a superhero but not a girl. This kind of apparent sexism is widely debated by feminists to legally improve the minds of people that have the potential to corrupt young kids.

== Challenges and Limitations ==
Feminist Digital Humanities also functions as a reiteration of feminist contributions and ideologies which extend the approaches and instruments that help to compile the work of feminists and propagate information among the members of society. Due to the increase in the dependency of the Internet through many online platforms, modern feminists are rampantly embracing the Internet as a primary medium of information gathering on issues pertaining to feminism. In the digital humanity sphere, there is undoubtedly gender imbalance. Between 2010 and 2013, the number of women authors accepted for the Alliance of Digital Humanities Organizations (ADHO) conferences was only around 30 per cent as compared to men (70%). Consequently, less recognition among female writers shows that women are underrepresented at the most crucial gatherings in the field. In this conference, there is also a visible bias against non-English authors during Digital Humanities conference presentations. Not only that, according to Weingart’s review, "feminisms and digital humanities" face a range of methodological and cultural prejudices that tend to plague the area of digital humanities. The major professional conference is known to be topically skewed towards masculinized methods, concerning "stylometric, programming and software, image processing and many more male-dominated fields."

Women and feminists who have been a part of digital humanities since it was first called "humanities computing" have been experiencing all sorts of structural misogyny through many intellectual engagements. The systematic discrimination, sexual harassment and most importantly, the minimization of feminist contributions towards many fields are uncommon and continue to obstruct the expansion of feminist digital humanities. In 2016, a Digital Humanities conference was held as an effort to discuss on issues concerning many fields in Digital Humanities, however, in the quest of expanding the diversity; the panels of feminist infrastructure were located in a separate building from the main building that most conference sessions were held. The panels include the director of the Australian Humanities Networked Infrastructure (HuNI) project, the head of the Canadian Writing Research Collaboratory, the director of the Advanced Research Consortium (ARC) in the United States, and the principal investigator of the Institute for High-Performance Sound Technologies for Access and Scholarship (HiPSTAS).

Despite the spectacular profile of the panels, there was a clear indication that feminist point of views on infrastructure was not well valued compared to other panels from different fields. Women of color and the Trans people through the 2016 Digital Humanities conference experience far worse treatment where they were subjected to the full force of exclusion. Therefore, Jamie Skye Bianco applies a performative mode in her work, "Man and His Tool, Again?: Queer and Feminist Notes on Practices in the Digital Humanities and Object Orientations Everywhere" in order to criticize the heteropatriarchal prejudices in textual studies dominated by digital humanities. The "socially engaged critical creativity" promoted by feminist theorists such as Sarah Kember and Joanna Zylinska is exemplified in Bianco’s work; thinking with and through the methods/tools that we criticize. Her piece and Nicole Starosielski’s subsequent reflection on teaching widen the scope of the conventional theoretical argument by stressing that "creative criticism" is fundamental to how we engage and connect between us (scholars) and students. In order for future digital humanities to succeed, intersectional feminism should be central to digital humanities practices.

Among major limitations in the proliferation of Feminist Digital Humanities to the public is the issue of underfunding and inadequate institutional or external support. The survey made by Christina Boyles on several recent works by female scholars such as Amanda Philips, Alexis Lothian, and Amy Earhart shows that while intersectional and critical digital humanities work has always been part of a community, the type of sustained funding familiar with projects that have canonical works or dominant theoretical frameworks has not yet been seen. It is not easy for digital humanities projects to acquire funding. Even a feminist project that has acquired grant funding, like Woman Writers Online (WWO) has not received any funding from the National Endowment for the Humanities (NEH). Wernimont added that "NEH will not fund any projects that promote a certain political, religious, or ideological point of view… or projects that support a specific program of social action." Hence, with no funding from other agencies or organizations, their abilities to expand their project to a larger scale will be restricted.

== The Archival of Feminist Digital Humanities Projects ==
One goal of feminist literary scholars has been to increase the scope of women's literary works in visible archives. The Orlando Project and The Women Writers Project are two early projects that undertook the task of filling in the gaps that existed in literary history in the 1980s. Both efforts sought to use the electronic format "to overcome the problems of inaccessibility and scarcity which had rendered women’s writing invisible for so long." One critique of a content-oriented approach to combating the marginalization of women's literary works is that it's simply not enough to add content to a system that is built upon a patriarchal methodology. "Literary scholars who depend on archival or rare book materials still confront, whether they acknowledge it or not, the legacy of an institutional form through which patriarchal power exercised the authority to determine value, classification, and access."

There is a need for all high-quality works to be digitalized for the next generation by scholars in order to ensure their preservation. With the innovation of the internet, feminist scholars also follow the trend of digital humanities projects to make many contributions from the past were archived and let other feminists’ voices stay relevant for the future generation, such as;

- The Orlando Project/Orlando 2.0

The Orlando Project was inspired by Virginia Woolf’s "Orlando: A Biography" and used an oak tree as a logo in remembrance of Orlando’s poem "The Oak Tree". The project team focused on the development of "Orlando: Women’s Writing in the British Isle from the Beginnings to the Present" and publicly published by Cambridge University Press as an interactive textbase for scholars and students. It was founded by Patricia Clements, Isobel Grundy and Susan Brown. Later, the project team expanded into more than 140 members of scholars, students, and technical personals contributed to the development of the interactive textbase.

The Orlando Project focuses on recovering feminist-related literature works, written by British women, men and other women. There are about 1413 writers identified together with their respective works and more than 30,000 events were chronicled. In addition, 25,000 sources were included in the events within the literary works. Other than producing the textbase, the project contributes to publishing books and articles about feminist writer’s history and computing-related content for many institutions, lecturers and conference. They are also collaborating with other project and institutions such as the Canadian Writing and Research Collaboratory (CWRC), Cambridge University Press, and The Women’s Writers Project.

- Women's Writers Project

The Brown University English Department founded the Women’s Writers Project (WWP) in the late 1980s. The project received its first funding from the National Endowment for the Humanities in 1988. It has transcribed about 200 texts in the first five years and made a draft printout for academic purpose. The project also collaborates with Oxford University Press to experiment with publishing editors of their respected works in traditional print form.

Women’s Writers Online (WWO) was published in 1999, enabling WWP collection available online. The project has been subscribed by over 200 institutions including universities, libraries and individuals. The subscription fee was offered as the main source to maintain the project continuity. WWP also held a series of conferences on "Women in the Archives", granting them a collaboration with The National Endowment for the Humanities (NEH) Collaborative Research Grant.

Women’s Writers Project has moved to Northeastern University together with team as part of the Digital Scholarship Group in the Northeastern University Library.

- CSOV or Center for Solutions to Online Violence

First known as the "Addressing Anti-Feminist Violence Online" project, CSOV was funded as part of the Digital Media and Learning Competition. It was a set of online discussions between 2013 until 2014. CSOV was founded by a team of seven; Danielle Cole, Izetta Autumn Mobley, Bianca Laureno, Sydette Harry, I’Nasah Crockett, Maegan Ortiz, and Jessica Marie Johnson. They named themselves "The Alchemists". In July 2015, they won a grant and were able to gain support from the collaborators of the competition. The Digital Media and Learning Competition is a challenge with a collaboration between HASTAC or Humanities, Arts, Science and Technology Alliance and Collaboratory, Duke University, the University of California Humanities Research Institute, and the MacArthur Foundation.

The purpose of CSOV is to address digital violence experienced by women and other issues related to gender, race, sexuality and ability. This project aims to improve the latency of internet access without physical and psychological harm which makes access to digital resources and communities easier. Now, CSOV is managed by FemTechNet, a network with members of talented scholars, students and artists who work or expertise in technology, science and feminism in a variety of fields. Founded in 2012, FemTechNet is actively collaborating with many institutions or like-minded groups to address the needs of students interested in feminist science-and-technology studies which CSOV is part of the network.

- Crash Override Network

Crash Override Network was founded in 2015 by Zoë Quinn and Alex Lifschitz. Both of them are game developers. The network was founded when the GamerGate controversy emerged and included both of them. They have been targeted with online abuse, which later became their goal to make this network as a platform for security and mental health therapy for the gaming community. It has partnered with Feminist Frequency and the Cyber Civil Rights Initiative (CCRI).

In December 2016, Crash Override Network’s hotline was temporarily closed. They are focusing on expanding resources and efforts to support the increases of calls and requests in the future.

== See also ==
- Cyberfeminism
- Feminist Technoscience
