= Jacqueline Wernimont =

American academic

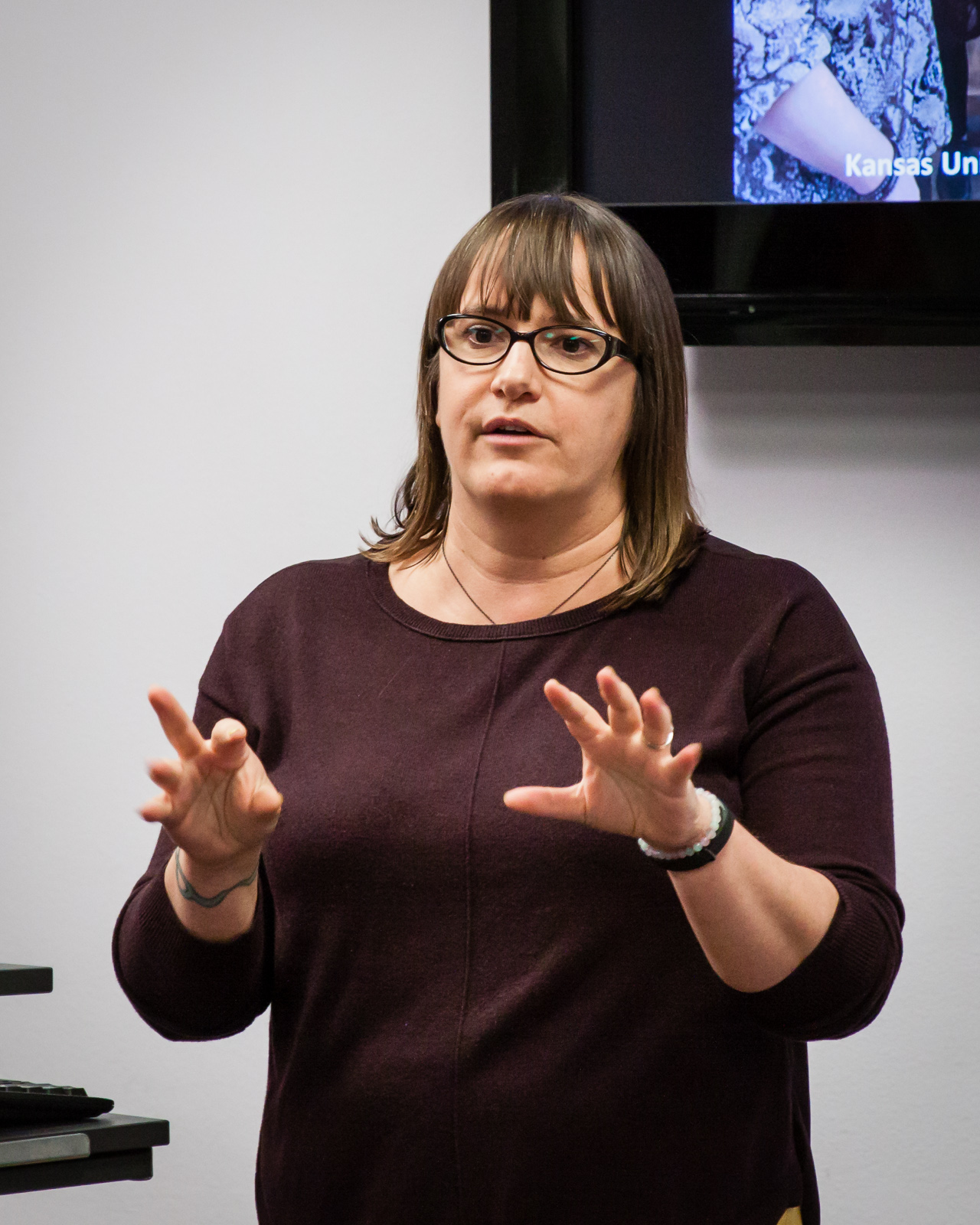
- 'Performance and the Archive' 2016 Arizona State University talk with Jacqueline Wernimont
- Education: University of Iowa; Brown University
- Scientific career
- Fields: Scripps College; Arizona State University; Dartmouth College

Jacqueline D. Wernimont is an American academic who is the Distinguished Professor in Digital Humanities and Social Engagement at Dartmouth College. Her first book, Numbered Lives Life and Death in Quantum Media, was released by MIT Press in January 2019. It is the first book to map connections in feminist media history. She is the founding Director of Human Security Collaborator (HS Collab), a collaboration of interdisciplinary academics working on digital civil rights and big data.

== Early life and education ==
Wernimont studied English and molecular biology at the University of Iowa. She moved to Brown University for her graduate studies, earning a master's degree and PhD in English Literature. When she started graduate school she worked on how postcolonial literature and the accounting of death were related. Wernimont worked on the Brown University Women Writers Project, where she began her career as a text encoder and ended up as a project manager. The Women Writers Project, which later relocated from Brown to Northeastern University, looks to reclaim the importance of pre-Victorian women's writing.

== Research ==
Wernimont joined Scripps College as an Assistant Professor of English, where she explored how poetries could be transformed into a 3D object. She directed the Counting the Dead project, which explored the relationship between early modern numerical and commemorative poetic technologies. She was appointed at Arizona State University, where she specialised in literary history and feminist digital media. She directed the graduate certificate in Digital Humanities. In 2015 she established the Center for Solutions to Online Violence. Together with Elizabeth Losh and Mikki Kendall, Wernimont looked at the Gamergate controversy. The trio convened the Addressing Anti-Feminist Violence Online conference at the Arizona State University.

She studied the history of eugenic sterilisation in California. Together with Alexandra Stern, Wernimont wrote The Eugenic Rubicon, a digital resource that compiled archival documents and data visualisation. The work was supported by the National Endowment for the Humanities Humanities Collections and Reference Resources seed grant. Indiana was the first state to pass eugenics laws in 1907, allowing the sterilisation of people deemed to be of diminished mental capacity. Wernimont has described how, with the illusion for genetic improvement, eugenics became a chance for men to control women. Between the 1920s and 1930s, sterilisation shifted from mainly men to women, with the majority from underrepresented minority groups. She found that girls as young as 13 were being sterilised, with some being described as being "in the class of the feebleminded". Eugenics laws began to be repealed in the 1970s, but non-consenting sterilisation has been reported as recently as 2010.

In October 2018 Wernimont joined Dartmouth College. She maintains an "angry bibliography", a collection of content produced by diverse academics. She was the chief editor of Intersectional Feminism and Digital Humanities. She is an active part of FemTechNet collective.

=== Publications ===
In January 2019 Wernimont's first book was published by MIT Press. Numbered Lives Life and Death in Quantum Media is a feminist media history of quantification. It includes death counts and activity trackers, quotidian media that determine who counts.
