= Feminist history =

Feminist perspective on history

Feminist history refers to the re-reading of history from a woman's perspective. It is not the same as the history of feminism, which outlines the origins and evolution of the feminist movement. It also differs from women's history, which focuses on the role of women in historical events. The goal of feminist history is to explore and illuminate the female viewpoint of history through rediscovery of female writers, artists, philosophers, etc., in order to recover and demonstrate the significance of women's voices and choices in the past. Feminist history seeks to change the nature of history to include gender into all aspects of historical analysis, while also looking through a critical feminist lens. Jill Matthews states "the purpose of that change is political: to challenge the practices of the historical discipline that have belittled and oppressed women, and to create practices that allow women an autonomy and space for self-definition"

Two particular problems which feminist history attempts to address are the exclusion of women from the historical and philosophical tradition, and the negative characterization of women or the feminine therein; however, feminist history is not solely concerned with issues of gender per se, but rather with the reinterpretation of history in a more holistic and balanced manner.

"If we take feminism to be that cast of mind that insists that the differences and inequalities between the sexes are the result of historical processes and are not blindly "natural," we can understand why feminist history has always had a dual mission—on the one hand to recover the lives, experiences, and mentalities of women from the condescension and obscurity in which they have been so unnaturally placed, and on the other to reexamine and rewrite the entire historical narrative to reveal the construction and workings of gender." —Susan Pedersen

The "disappearing woman" has been a focus of attention for academic feminist scholarship. Research into women's history and literature reveals a rich heritage of neglected culture.

== Understanding feminist history ==
Feminist history combines the search for past female scholars with a modern feminist perspective on how history is affected by them. While many mistake it as women's history, feminist history does not solely focus on the retelling of history from a woman's perspective. Rather, it is interpreting history with a feminist frame of mind. It is also not to be confused with the history of feminism, which recounts the history of the feminist movements. Feminist historians, instead, include "cultural and social investigations" in the job description. Feminist history came into being as women began writing accounts of their own and other women's lives. A few of these, such as Susan B. Anthony and Audre Lorde, documented histories of their feminist movements.

Feminist historians collect to analyze and analyze to connect. Rather than just recording women's history, they allow a connection to be made with "public history." However, problems remain in integrating this history into a curriculum appropriate for students. Finally, feminist historians must now be able to understand the digital humanities involved in creating an online database of their primary sources as well as published works done by notable feminist historians. Feminist digital humanists work with feminist historians to reveal an online integration of the two histories. Harvard's Women's Studies Database contain sources, like the Gerritsen Collection, that allow scholarly papers by feminists to be written and publicly convey the fact that there is more than one history and the progress made in combining them.

== Relations to women's history ==
Feminist historians use women's history to explore the different voices of past women. This gathering of information requires the help of experts who have dedicated their lives to this pursuit. It provides historians with primary sources that are vital to the integration of histories. Firsthand accounts, like Fiedler's And the Walls Come Tumbling Down? (A Feminist View from East Berlin) recounts the daily lives of past women. It documents how their lives were affected by the laws of their government. Women's historians go on to interpret how the laws changed these women's lives, but feminist historians rely on this information to observe the 'disappearing woman'. Fiedler even mentioned that "[t]hese feminists were disappointed when they meant ordinary eastern women who were good housewives too, while enjoying outside work." Because these feminists only knew the public history of the German Democratic Republic, they projected themselves into the imaginary.

Upon investigation of eastern women's lives, they found that though the GDR's socialist policies encouraged women in the labor force, there had been no women creating these policies. Once again, the patriarch had created a public history in which women were cut out. The discovery of neglected cultural accounts, similar to Fiedler's, has allowed women's historians to create large databases, available to feminist historians, out of them. These sources are analyzed by the historians to compare them to scholarly works published during the same time period. Finding works that are within the same time period is not too difficult, but the challenge is in knowing how to combine what they learned from the source with what they know from the works.

== Integrating histories ==
Feminist historians see mainly two specific histories. The first is the public, singular history. It is composed of political events and newspapers. The second is made up of women's history and analyzed primary sources. The integration of these two histories helps historians to look at the past with a more feminist lens, the way feminist historians do. Professor Peter G. Filene of the University of North Carolina recounted in his paper Integrating Women's History and Regular History that "[his] purpose is to help students understand the values and behavior of people who are unlike themselves. Through history we enter other lives, analyze the forces that shaped those lives, and ultimately understand patterns of culture." In fact, when Filene was asked to teach a course on the history of American women, the revelations of past women allowed him to recognize that he was not learning heroine history, or herstory, but a compensatory history. However, this thought limited his studies. He found himself thinking of women's contributions to what men had already written down. Rather than having the histories of the 'public' and the 'domestic' sphere, one should know that this line between the two is imaginary.

Though not all women are politicians or war generals, boys are raised in the domestic sphere. Not only that, but men come back to it every day in their private homes. Even President Theodore Roosevelt can be quoted to say "[n]o man can be a good citizen who is not a good husband and a good father." Similar to how history needs domestic history incorporated into it, men's history cannot be understood without their private experiences known. Women's history thus needs their private experiences to be combined with their public. To successfully integrate these histories, the world must not have male and female spheres that are synonyms for the private and public. The connections found in public and private men's and women's history need to be systematically synthesized to successfully integrate them. So the idea of just two histories creates the challenge that most feminist historians have.

== Feminist historiography ==
Feminist historiography is another notable facet of feminist history. One important feminist historiography writer and researcher is Judith M. Bennett. In her book, History Matters: Patriarchy and the Challenge of Feminism, Bennett writes on the importance of studying a "patriarchal equilibrium". Cheryl Glenn also writes on the importance of feminist historiography "Writing women (or any other traditionally disenfranchised group) into the history of rhetoric, then, can be an ethically and intellectually responsible gesture that disrupts those frozen memories in order to address silences, challenge absences, and assert women's contributions to public life" This facet of feminist history inspect historical writings that are typically assumed to be canon, and reinvents them under a feminist lens.

== See also ==
- Herstory
- History of feminism
- Women's history
- Feminist digital humanities
