= Julius Matthews =

Julius Matthews may refer to:

- Julius J. Matthews (1826–1916), American politician in Iowa
- Jill Julius Matthews (born 1949), Australian historian
