= Emiliano De Cristofaro =

US-based Italian Computer Scientist

- Education: University of Salerno (BSc); University of California, Irvine (PhD)
- Known for: Privacy-enhancing technologies; Trustworthy machine learning; Research on online harms and disinformation
- Awards: ACM IMC Distinguished Paper Award (2018); ISOC NDSS Distinguished Paper Award (2018); ACM CSCW Impact Recognition Award (2021); ACM Distinguished Member (2024); IEEE S&P Distinguished Paper Award (2025)
- Scientific career
- Fields: Computer security; Privacy-enhancing technologies; Machine learning
- Workplaces: University of California, Riverside; University College London; PARC
- Thesis: Sharing Sensitive Information with Privacy (2011)
- Doctoral advisor: Gene Tsudik
- Website: emilianodc.com

Emiliano De Cristofaro is an Italian computer scientist and a professor of computer science at the University of California, Riverside. His research focuses on security and privacy-enhancing technologies, trustworthy machine learning, and the measurement of online harms. From 2013 to 2023 he was on the faculty of University College London, where he was Professor of Security and Privacy Enhancing Technologies and led the university's Information Security Research Group. He is a co-founder of the iDRAMA Lab, an international research group studying online communities and disinformation. In 2024 he was named a Distinguished Member of the Association for Computing Machinery.

== Education ==
De Cristofaro received a five-year BSc Honors degree (summa cum laude) in computer science from the University of Salerno, Italy, in 2005. He completed a PhD in Networked Systems at the University of California, Irvine in 2011, under the supervision of Gene Tsudik; his dissertation was titled Sharing Sensitive Information with Privacy.

== Career ==
Before joining academia, De Cristofaro was a member of the research staff at PARC (a Xerox company) from 2011 to 2013. In October 2013, he joined University College London (UCL) as a senior lecturer; he was promoted to reader in 2017 and to Professor of Security and Privacy Enhancing Technologies in 2019. In 2017, he co-founded the iDRAMA Lab, an international research group studying online communities and disinformation. At UCL, he was head of the Information Security Research Group from 2018 to 2022 and director of the UK Academic Centre of Excellence in Cyber Security Research from 2019 to 2023. Between 2019 and 2022, he was a member of the Technology Advisory Panel of the UK Information Commissioner's Office. He has also been a faculty fellow at The Alan Turing Institute.

In 2023, he moved to the University of California, Riverside as a professor in the Department of Computer Science and Engineering.

== Research ==
De Cristofaro's research spans applied cryptography, privacy-enhancing technologies, trustworthy machine learning, and the empirical study of online harms. As of 2026, according to Google Scholar, his work has been cited more than 20,000 times.

=== Privacy-enhancing technologies and machine learning ===
His early work focused on private set intersection and other cryptographic protocols for privacy-preserving computation, including techniques for securely testing human genomes. He subsequently worked on membership inference attacks against machine learning models, co-authoring the 2017 paper "LOGAN: Membership Inference Attacks Against Generative Models" and the 2019 IEEE Symposium on Security and Privacy paper "Exploiting Unintended Feature Leakage in Collaborative Learning". In 2025, he and his student Georgi Ganev showed that synthetic datasets described as anonymous remained vulnerable to privacy attacks, and argued that similarity-based privacy metrics are inadequate. In 2026, with Meenatchi Sundaram Muthu Selva Annamalai and Peter Kairouz, he presented CLIOPATRA, a privacy attack on systems that generate aggregate "insights" from users' conversations with AI assistants. Tested against Anthropic's Clio, the attack inserted crafted chats into the system to induce it to leak sensitive details from a target user's conversations, and the authors argued that layered heuristic protections such as PII redaction, clustering, and LLM-based privacy auditing do not adequately protect user data. The paper was selected for an oral presentation at the 2026 Conference on Neural Information Processing Systems (NeurIPS).

=== Online harms and fringe communities ===
Together with collaborators including Jeremy Blackburn, Gianluca Stringhini, and Savvas Zannettou, De Cristofaro has carried out large-scale measurement studies of fringe online communities. A 2017 study analyzed 4chan's /pol/ ("Politically Incorrect") board and its influence on the wider web. A 2018 paper, "On the Origins of Memes by Means of Fringe Web Communities", traced how memes spread between web communities and received a distinguished paper award at the Internet Measurement Conference. Later studies examined state-sponsored troll accounts on Twitter and Reddit, the QAnon conspiracy theory on Reddit and Voat, activity on the Parler social network around the January 6 Capitol attack, the migration of users after Reddit banned the subreddit r/The_Donald, and the toxicity of the manosphere.

He has also worked on the automated detection of cyberbullying on social media, the operation of fake-engagement "like farms" on Facebook, and the measurement of internet censorship, including a study of web filtering in Syria.

== Awards and honors ==
In 2024, De Cristofaro was named a Distinguished Member of the Association for Computing Machinery for "contributions to privacy-enhancing technologies and internet measurement".

His co-authored papers have received distinguished paper or best paper awards at venues including the IEEE Symposium on Security and Privacy (2025), the Internet Measurement Conference (2018), the Network and Distributed System Security Symposium (2018), and the ACM Web Science Conference (2023), as well as an impact recognition award at the ACM Conference on Computer-Supported Cooperative Work and Social Computing (2021).

His privacy research has also received the 2017 Data Protection by Design Award from the Catalan Data Protection Authority, and was runner-up for the INRIA–CNIL Privacy Protection Award in 2019.

== Selected publications ==
- Pyrgelis, Apostolos; Troncoso, Carmela; De Cristofaro, Emiliano (2018). "Knock Knock, Who's There? Membership Inference on Aggregate Location Data". Network and Distributed System Security Symposium (NDSS).
- Melis, Luca; Song, Congzheng; De Cristofaro, Emiliano; Shmatikov, Vitaly (2019). "Exploiting Unintended Feature Leakage in Collaborative Learning". IEEE Symposium on Security and Privacy.
- Zannettou, Savvas; Caulfield, Tristan; De Cristofaro, Emiliano; Sirivianos, Michael; Stringhini, Gianluca; Suarez-Tangil, Guillermo (2018). "On the Origins of Memes by Means of Fringe Web Communities". ACM Internet Measurement Conference.
- Ganev, Georgi; De Cristofaro, Emiliano (2025). "The Inadequacy of Similarity-based Privacy Metrics: Privacy Attacks against 'Truly Anonymous' Synthetic Datasets". IEEE Symposium on Security and Privacy.
- Annamalai, Meenatchi Sundaram Muthu Selva; De Cristofaro, Emiliano; Kairouz, Peter (2026). "CLIOPATRA: Extracting Private Information from LLM Insights." Conference on Neural Information Processing Systems (NeurIPS).
