= Losh =

Losh is a surname. Notable people with the surname include:

- Elizabeth Losh, American media theorist
- James Losh (1763–1833), English lawyer, reformer and unitarian
- Sarah or Sara Losh (1785–1853), English architect and designer
- William Losh (1770–1861), English chemist and industrialist credited with introducing the Leblanc process

LoSH also stands for:

- Legion of Super-Heroes
