= Feminism and technology =

Feminism and technology may refer to:

- Feminist technoscience, a transdisciplinary field that is an amalgamation of the study of feminism and science, technology and society
- Cyberfeminism, a range of theories, debates, and practices about the relationship between gender and digital culture
- Networked feminism, the online mobilization and coordination of feminists in response to sexist acts
