= Ploger =

Ploger may refer to:

- Jared Ploger, American politician
- Johannes Pløger (1922-1991), Danish footballer
- Ploger-Moneymaker Place, historic building

== See also ==
- Plog
