= Tina Ng =

American electrical engineer

Tse Nga (Tina) Ng (born 1980) is an American electrical engineer specializing in the additive manufacturing of flexible electronics, with applications including medical imaging, active packaging, and electronic skin. She is a professor of electrical and computer engineering at the University of California, San Diego.

== Education and career ==
Ng was born in 1980 in Hong Kong. In the early 1990s, when she was a pre-teen, her family moved to Saipan, in the US territory of the Northern Mariana Islands, because of the impending handover of Hong Kong from the UK to China. It was in Saipan that she took the English name Tina.

She majored in chemistry at Knox College (Illinois), graduating in 2000. She went to Cornell University for graduate study in physical chemistry, and received her Ph.D. there in 2006 under the supervision of John Marohn. Her dissertation was Developments in Force Detection: Integrated Cantilever Magnetometry and Electric Force Microscopy of Organic Semiconductors.

During her doctoral studies, she interned at the Palo Alto Research Center (PARC). After postdoctoral research at PARC, she continued there as a staff researcher from 2008 to 2015, until moving to the University of California, San Diego as an associate professor in 2016.

== Recognition ==
Ng was elected to the National Academy of Inventors in 2021. She was listed as a distinguished lecturer of the IEEE Sensors Council for 2023–2025, and named to the 2025 class of IEEE Fellows "for contributions to flexible organic electronics used in large-area imagers and sensing systems".
