= PowerCloud Systems =

- Industry: Cloud networking
- Headquarters: Palo Alto, California, USA

PowerCloud Systems was a cloud networking company located in Palo Alto, California. The company designed and manufactured cloud-powered Wi-Fi systems for businesses, carriers and consumers and was a corporate spin-off from the Palo Alto Research Center (PARC), a Xerox company. PowerCloud was purchased by Comcast in July 2014.

== History ==
PowerCloud Systems was incorporated in 2009 and was spun-out as an independent firm in 2010 with investment from Walden Venture Capital and Javelin Ventures.

On September 20, 2010, at PARC's 40th anniversary celebration, PowerCloud showcased its first product, the CloudCommand online software platform for network equipment providers. This platform enabled network equipment vendors and communications service providers to introduce Wi-Fi networking products that could be managed from the cloud. The platform has subsequently evolved and PowerCloud now offers a portfolio of cloud-managed wireless access points and a Web-based management dashboard that are both white-labeled by communications service providers and are marketed directly to businesses through managed service providers that wish to manage their clients wireless networks.

On January 25, 2011, D-Link became the first major OEM vendor to launch product based on the CloudCommand platform. Zyxel announced product at Interop in May 2011 and launched on November 11, 2011.

In December 2011, PowerCloud Systems announced it had secured $6 million in Series B funding in a round that was led by Qualcomm Ventures and included participation from its existing investors – Walden Venture Capital, Javelin Venture Partners and PARC. In April 2013, PowerCloud Systems officially entered into the consumer Wi-Fi market with the introduction of Skydog, a combination Wi-Fi router, cloud service and HTML5-based application.

In 2013, the company began shipping a commercial solution under its own brand and announced Nickelodeon Resort as a customer in September.

In December announced partnership with Common Sense Media. The company showcased the product at CES 2014 to favorable reviews.

In July 2014 PowerCloud Systems announced on the homepage of Skydog that they had been acquired, and retail sales of Skydog router had ceased. No acquirer was named in announcement. In July 2014, Comcast confirmed to Tech Crunch that they had acquired PowerCloud Systems, as speculated. PowerCloud's technology serves as the basis for Comcast's xFi which is now available to 23.5 million homes.

== Management ==
Jeff Abramowitz founded PowerCloud Systems and served as the company's president and CEO. Abramowitz’ is included in the Computer History Museum for his role in the formation and growth of the W-Fi industry.

Abramowitz has held executive positions in the Wi-Fi industry for more than 25 years. He was director of Wireless Product Management at 3Com where he spearheaded the company's wireless LAN efforts and its first wireless initiative, as well as serving as the company's representative on the board of the Wireless LAN Association.

At Intersil, Abramowitz launched the company's Wi-Fi efforts into the home.

At NoWires Needed, a Dutch start-up, Abramowitz was responsible for worldwide Marketing and US operations. He helped to introduce the industry's first ARM-based Medium Access Controller capable of supporting performance required for the 54 Mbit/s IEEE 802.11a standard. NoWires Needed was acquired by Intersil in June 2000 for $156M.

Abramowitz was responsible for Wi-Fi marketing and business development at Broadcom. While there, he helped to introduce the first CMOS Wi-Fi chipset, first single chip Wi-Fi, and first 802.11g solution.

Abramowitz was responsible for marketing and strategy at wireless company Azimuth Systems, where he helped to introduce the first Wi-Fi automated test equipment for MIMO radios and the first platform for Wi-Fi Alliance testing

As an entrepreneur-in-residence at Xerox PARC he spun out PowerCloud Systems and served as the founder, CEO and chairman of the board.

Abramowitz is a current board member and past president of Cloud4Wi, a leading Wi-Fi services platform for marketing, location services for retail, restaurant and transportation. Abramowitz was inducted into the Wi-Fi Now Hall of Fame in 2019.

Andrea Peiro co-founded PowerCloud Systems and serves as the company's CTO and chief product officer. Peiro had been a well-known product strategist, and was a former intelligence officer in the Italian Navy.

== Products ==
=== Cloud Command Enterprise ===
CloudCommand Enterprise is a Wi-Fi system that consists of Wi-Fi access points that can be deployed, secured and managed via a cloud-based management interface. This approach, which does not require wireless controller hardware, is ideal for deployments with a high-density of mobile users, such as hotels, restaurants, shopping centers, schools, conference centers, assisted living facilities, and Multi-Dwelling Units (MDUs) such as apartment buildings. This method of instantiating a wireless network does not require onsite wireless LAN controller hardware; as the access points are managed via the cloud network. Ostensibly this reduces equipment costs and eases management. This technology also enables businesses or Value-Added Resellers to create multiple private wireless networks using the same public access infrastructure.

=== Skydog ===
Skydog is a combination 802.11n Wi-Fi router, cloud service and HTML5-based application. Skydog gives consumer visibility into and control over the home Wi-Fi network. They can view and control any device connected to the network and prioritize resources by user, device or application. The solution was a consumer version of the company's enterprise product.

Skydog's capabilities represent a break from historical use of Wi-Fi routers, most of which were primarily used to provide wireless connectivity to a household's Internet connection and little else. Some existing high-end routers allow for remote access and the instantiation of parental controls. Skydog claimed their cloud solution integrated parental controls, a mobile experience, and more granular control over specific devices, users, and applications connecting to the home network. Consumers could then better control distribution of bandwidth and monitor activity on their network. PowerCloud Systems marketed the solution primarily to families with children using the Internet, saying that it allows parents to better understand and manage how their kids use the Web.

Skydog was originally funded via Kickstarter in Spring 2013. The project was fully funded and received $121,813 in funding from more than 1,000 backers by May 14, 2013. On September 3, 2013, PowerCloud Systems announced that it had shipped Skydog on time to its 1000 Kickstarter backers. PowerCloud Systems made Skydog available to the general public on October 30, 2013.

Skydog was positively reviewed as an Internet solution for families by media including PC Magazine and Yahoo.

On March 19, 2014, PowerCloud announced WebRover, a free update to the Skydog cloud service, that provided a list of more than 1,000 sitesrated for age-appropriate content and educational quality by Common Sense Media.
