= Women Writers Project =

Literary research and publication project

The Women Writers Project, or WWP, is a long-term research and digital publication project within the field of feminist digital humanities that makes texts from early modern women writers in the English language available online through electronic text encoding. Since 1999, WWP has maintained Women Writers Online, an electronic collection of rare or difficult to obtain works written or co-authored by women from the early modern period. It is currently housed within the Northeastern University Library's Digital Scholarship Group.

== History ==
WWP was founded in 1986 by English faculty members at Brown University and literary scholars from other institutions, but those involved were discussing the project as early as 1984. The project was initially created to address the lack of access to early English women writers before the Victorian era and promote new research on the recovered writings. Scholars combined research and analysis strategies from early modern women's studies and newly-emerging electronic text encoding computational methods to display and disseminate women's writing for new interpretations.

One of WWP's earliest transcriptions was a 15-volume series "Women Writers in English, 1350–1850," completed in collaboration with Oxford University Press, which were released in print and for electronic use.

In 1993, with the publication of the expanded Text Encoding Initiative (TEI) guidelines, the WWP began a three-year period of research on how to use the new guidelines to represent early women's texts. During this time, few new texts were added to the collection, but a new set of encoding methods and improved systems of documentation were implemented, as well as intensive training for those working on the project.

From 1996 onwards, new texts were once again encoded with the new TEI standards. In 1997, WWP received a $400,000 grant over three years from the Andrew W. Mellon Foundation to develop "Renaissance Women Online." The project studied the impact of electronic texts on teaching and research. The project included the creation of introductory materials for 100 texts, currently constituting a sub-collection of WWO. In 1999, WWO was released online.

In 2013 the WWP moved from Brown University in Providence, Rhode Island, to Northeastern University in Boston, Massachusetts.

== Women Writers Online ==
Women Writers Online, or WWO, is the digital collection of early English women's writing ranging from 1526 to 1850 maintained by WWP. As of 23 October 2023, the textbase contains more than 450 individual works. Viewing and usage of the texts are available only to individuals or institutions with paid subscriptions. Information about the textbase, such as document metadata, encoding practices, funding records, are freely accessible. The WWP offers a free month-long trial, and the textbase is usually open-access for the month of March, in honor of Women's History Month.

The focus of the corpus is currently on hard to find or generally inaccessible texts from both well known and more obscure writers. Within this focus is a sizeable collection of religious writing from the Renaissance as well as works of early fiction, drama, and political commentary. Digitized writers include, among many others:

- Anna Laetitia Barbauld
- Aphra Behn
- Margaret Cavendish
- Queen Elizabeth I
- Margaret Fell
- Felicia Hemans
- Katherine Parr
- Mary Sidney
- Mary Wollstonecraft

== Digital tools ==
In March 2012, the WWP released a new interface for WWO that expanded user's search capabilities.

WWO uses digital humanities theory and practice to solicit new interpretations of genre and form within feminist, literary, and digital humanities fields. Queries are entered into the textbase's search interface to find occurrences or relevant tagged texts, and these can be further sorted and analyzed using "keyword-in-context" (KWIC) or "Gobbet" display options. Users can toggle between a broader display and "reader mode," as well as situate the writing on a time slider for historical and literary context.

== Resources and outreach ==
Since 2004, WWP has hosted several text encoding workshops and seminars held throughout the year for various skill levels. In March 2011, WWP held their first seminar on XSL Transformations (XSLT) at Brown University.

From 2008 to 2011, the WWP also hosted an annual conference titled Women in the Archives in collaboration with the Sarah Doyle Women's Center and several other groups at Brown University. The opening seminar held on 22 March, 2008, titled Revealing Women, introduced the seminar series as an exploration of how archived writings of early English women shaped the approach to research and pedagogy on the subject.

September 2012, then-director Julia Flanders delivered a presentation at the Maryland Institute for Technology in the Humanities discussing the support available for educators and researchers new to XML technologies and TEI encoding through the TEI Archiving, Publishing, and Access Service (TAPAS).

In addition to the Women Writers Online collection, the WWP also offers some public resources helpful for researchers and teachers interested in early modern women writers. These include orientations for getting the most out of researching within the online collection, possible assignments that take advantage of the online user interface, and syllabi submitted by professors that incorporate the online texts and focus on courses in Renaissance and early modern literature, women's studies, and related subjects.

== Notable people ==
- Rosie Stephenson-Goodknight, Wikipedia Visiting Scholar, Women Writers Project (2017–)

== See also ==
- List of women writers
