= Jonathan Alexander =

American rhetorician and memoirist (born 1967)

- Born: October 2, 1967 (age 59); New Orleans, Louisiana
- Citizenship: American
- Education: Louisiana State University (BA, MA, PhD)
- Occupations: Academic, Cultural Critic, Editor, and Memoirist
- Writing career
- Years active: 1990–present
- Subjects: Writing Studies & Rhetoric, New Media Studies & Digital Rhetoric, Genre and Popular Fiction, Life Writing, Sexuality Studies
- Website: the-blank-page.com

Jonathan Alexander (born October 2, 1967) is an American rhetorician and memoirist. He is Chancellor's Professor of English, Informatics, Education, and Gender & Sexuality Studies at the University of California, Irvine and currently serves as chair of the Department of English. His scholarly and creative work is situated at the intersections of digital culture, sexuality, and composition studies. For his work in cultural journalism and memoir, Tom Lutz, founding editor of the Los Angeles Review of Books, has called him "one of our finest essayists."

== Education ==
Alexander received his BA in English and an MA and PhD in Comparative Literature (1993) from Louisiana State University. He studied with James Olney, who was the Voorhies Professor of English and an editor of The Southern Review.

== Academic contributions ==
Alexander has worked primarily as an academic, scholar, higher educator, and administrator, with a current appointment at UC, Irvine. He also works across media. He is a frequent contributor to the Los Angeles Review of Books, where he served as Young Adult Fiction section editor and the host of the video series, "Writing Sex." At UCI he was also co-host of the podcast series "We Are UCI: Redefining Student Success for the 21st Century." In 2019, he co-organized a poetry and art exhibit with artist Antoinette LaFarge called "Burning Time," an imagined memory project about Alexander's now deceased gay uncle, in which Alexander and LaFarge attempted to imagine and depict his possible mid-20th century life in New Orleans' French Quarter.

== Creative nonfiction and the Creep Trilogy ==
More recently, Alexander has turned his attention to writing creative nonfiction, publishing a series of memoirs. Stroke Book: The Diary of a Blindspot was published by Fordham University Press in 2021 and details the author's experience of a minor stroke and how he understands the stroke's relationship to the long-term experience of homophobia. Another set of books, loosely called "The Creep Trilogy," uses formal experimentation to document Alexander's experience of homophobia as a kid in the Deep South and his struggle to come to grips with self-hatred. Recounting a similar set of stories in overlapping fashion, the retelling plays out different perspectives on his personal history and Alexander's attempts to come to terms over time with his past. The books include Creep: A Life, a Theory, an Apology (2017), Bullied: The Story of an Abuse (2021), and Dear Queer Self (2022). Writing specifically about Bullied, author Julietta Singh offers a comment that could reflect much of Alexander's creative nonfiction project: "Expanding the cultural frame of what constitutes sexual abuse, he ruminates over the enduring psychic and bodily effects of homophobia. In so doing, this gorgeous book seeks to redress some of the ways we have used each other in the service of making marginalized life more livable, and ultimately redirects our energy toward the transformation of a world that continues to punish our differences."

== Awards ==
His books have been nominated for various awards, including the Lambda Literary Award and the Computers and Composition Distinguished Book Award. His book, On Multimodality: New Media in Composition Studies won both the Conference on College Composition and Communication (CCCC) Outstanding Book Award and the Computers and Composition Distinguished Book Award. In 2012, Bisexuality and Queer Theory was a finalist for the Lambda Literary Award for Bisexual Literature. Techne: Queer Meditations on Writing the Subject won the 2015 Lavender Rhetorics Award for Excellence in Queer Scholarship. Alexander is a three-time recipient of the Ellen Nold Award for Best Article in the field of Computers and Composition Studies. In 2011, he was given the Charles Moran Award for Distinguished Contributions to the Field of Computers and Writing. In 2018, his memoir Creep: A Life, a Theory, an Apology, was a finalist for a Lambda Literary Award. Bullied: The Story of an Abuse was the recipient of a 2022 "Ippy" Gold Medal, awarded by the Independent Publisher Book Awards. In 2023, he was given the CCCC's Co-Exemplar Award for "representing the highest ideals of scholarship, teaching, and service to the entire profession." He also won the CCCC's 2023 Lavender Rhetorics Award for "Nontraditional Scholarly Text Award: Jonathan Alexander, Creep Trilogy, WRITING SEX, and Stroke Book: The Diary of a Blindspot."

== Books ==
- The Small World of Exceptions: Selected Poems. Purple Breeze Press. (November 2026) ISBN 979-8-9954928-8-7
- Becoming Writers: Twenty-First-Century Ways of Composing. Co-edited with Karen Lunsford and Carl Whithaus. Utah State University Press. (December 2026). ISBN 978-1-64642-962-2
- Lit to Lit: Composition/Rhetoric and the Literary Arts. Utah State University Press. (October 2026). ISBN 978-1-64642-936-3
- Damage: Notes on a Queer Aesthetic. Fordham University Press. (June 2026). ISBN 9781531513160
- Writing and Desire: Queer Ways of Composing. University of Pittsburgh Press. (May 2023). ISBN 978-0822947776
- Programming the Future: Politics, Resistance, and Utopia in Contemporary Speculative TV. Co-authored with Sherryl Vint. Columbia University Press. (November 2022). ISBN 978-0231198301
- Dear Queer Self: An Experiment in Memoir. Acre Books. (March 2022). ISBN 978-1946724465
- The Routledge Handbook of Queer Rhetoric. Co-edited with Jacqueline Rhodes. Routledge. (2022). ISBN 978-0367696580
- Stroke Book: The Diary of a Blindspot. Fordham University Press. (October 2021). ISBN 978-0823297672
- Bullied: The Story of an Abuse. Punctum Books. (Fall 2021). ISBN 978-1-953035-72-1
- Science Fiction and the Dismal Science: Essays on the Business of Dreammaking. Co-edited by Gary Westfahl, Gregory Benford, and Howard V. Hendrix. McFarland. (December 2019). ISBN 978-1476677385
- Unruly Rhetorics: Protest, Persuasion, and Publics. Co-edited with Susan Jarratt and Nancy Welch. Pittsburgh UP. (November 2018) ISBN 978-0822965565
- The Routledge Handbook of Digital Writing and Rhetoric. Co-edited with Jacqueline Rhodes. Routledge. (April 2018) ISBN 978-1138671362
- Creep: A Life, a Theory, an Apology. Punctum Books. (2017). ISBN 978-1947447103
- Writing Youth: Young Adult Fiction as Literacy Sponsorship. Lexington Books: Rowman & Littlefield (2017). ISBN 1498538428
- Sexual Rhetorics: Methods, Identities, Publics. Co-edited with Jacqueline Rhodes. Routledge (November 2015). ISBN 1138906875
- Techne: Queer Meditations on Writing the Self. Co-authored with Jacqueline Rhodes. Computers and Composition Digital Press (September 2015). http://ccdigitalpress.org/ebooks-and-projects/techne
- On Multimodality: New Media in Composition Studies. Co-authored with Jacqueline Rhodes. NCTE/CCCC Studies in Writing & Rhetoric (2014). ISBN 0814134122
- Understanding Rhetoric: A Graphic Guide to Writing. Co-authored with Elizabeth Losh. Bedford/St. Martin's (2013, 2nd edition 2017). ISBN 031264096X
- Bisexuality and Queer Theory: Intersections, Connections and Challenges. Co-edited with Serena Anderlini D'Onofrio. Routledge (2012). ISBN 1138817422
- Finding Out: An Introduction to LGBT Studies. Co-authored with Deborah T. Meem and Michelle Gibson. Sage Publications (2009, 2nd edition 2013, 3rd edition 2017). ISBN 1452235287
- Literacy, Sexuality, Pedagogy: Theory and Practice for Composition Studies. Utah State University Press (2008). ISBN 0874217016
- Digital Youth: Emerging Literacies on the World Wide Web. Hampton Press (2005). ISBN 157273650X
- Role Play: Distance Learning and the Teaching of Writing. Co-edited with Marcia Dickson. Hampton Press (2005) ISBN 1572736593
- Argument Now, a Brief Rhetoric. Co-authored with Margaret Barber. Pearson/Longman (2005) ISBN 0321113608
- Bisexuality and Transgenderism: InterSEXions of the Others. Co-edited with Karen Yescavage. Routledge (2005). ISBN 1560232870
