= Plog =

Plog may refer to:

- Anthony Plog (born 1947), American conductor
- Jobst Plog, director (1991–2008) of the broadcaster Norddeutscher Rundfunk
- Stephen Plog (fl. 1980–1997), American archaeologist and anthropologist
- Plog Island, an Antarctic island in Prydz Bay
- A verb for the noun plogging which is jogging and picking up litter
- LifeType, a blogging platform, originally developed under the name pLog
- plog, a Unix command related to the Point-to-Point Protocol daemon
- Plog, a photo delivery system worked on by scientist Rich Gossweiler
- Plough, in Swedish and Norwegian
- Plog, a party/play blog dedicated to party and travel adventures.

== See also ==
- Ploger
