= Alexandra Juhasz =

Feminist writer

Alexandra Jeanne "Alex" Juhasz (born 1964) is a feminist writer and theorist of media production. Juhasz is a moving image artist, well known for producing the film Watermelon Woman, and working on important queer video activist projects.

== Education ==
Juhasz received her B.A. in American Studies and English at Amherst College in 1986. Shortly after graduating she participated in a year-long artist's program sponsored by the Whitney Museum (1987–1988). Juhasz also attended New York University and earned her doctorate with distinction in Cinema Studies (1992). She was awarded the Society for Cinema Studies' First Prize in 1993 for her doctoral dissertation: "Re-Mediating AIDS: The Politics of Community Produced Video."

== Career ==
Juhasz began her career at New York University in 1990 as adjunct instructor in cinema studies. From 1991 to 1994 she worked as an assistant professor (English and women's studies) at Swarthmore College.

She then took a position at Pitzer College, where she was an assistant professor from 1995 to 1997 and an associate professor from 1997 to 2003. She was a full professor in media history, theory, and production at Pitzer College from 2003 to 2016, as well as a professor in the Cultural Studies, Art, and English Departments at Claremont Graduate University. In Fall 2016, she became Chairperson of the Department of Film at Brooklyn College. In December 2019, Juhasz was named a distinguished professor by CUNY's board of trustees.

Juhasz's research interests include documentary video production, women's film, and feminist film theory. She has written a variety of articles focusing on feminist issues such as teenage sexuality, AIDS, and sex education. Her work concentrates on online feminist pedagogy, learning from YouTube, and other common uses of digital media. Through all this work she assembled the VHS Activism Archive, a collection that is being digitized for access on the Internet Archive.

Juhasz has taught courses at multiple locations and institutions including NYU, Bryn Mawr College, Swarthmore College, Pitzer College, Claremont Graduate University, and on YouTube. Her courses incorporate activist media, documentary, media archives, and feminist media. She is the co-founder, with Anne Balsamo of FemTechNet, a network of scholars and artists engaged with issues related to technology and gender.

Juhasz has produced two feature films: The Owls and The Watermelon Woman. She has also produced over a dozen educational documentaries that focus on feminist concerns ranging from teen pregnancy to AIDS, such as Video Remains.

== Publications ==
- “#cut/paste+bleed: Entangling Feminist Affect, Action and Production On and Offline,” in Jentery Sayers, ed. Routledge Companion to Media Studies and Digital Humanities (Routledge: 2018): 18-32.
- Blackwell Companion to Film Studies: Documentary and Documentary Histories. Co-edited with Alisa Lebow (Cambridge, MA: Blackwell Press, forthcoming 2014/16).
- Learning from YouTube. Cambridge, MA: The MIT Press, 2011.
- F is for Phony: Fake Documentary and Truth's Undoing, Edited with Jesse Lerner (University of Minnesota Press, 2006).
- Women of Vision: Histories in Feminist Media Transcripts from 20 interviews in feminist film and video history. (University of Minnesota Press, 2001).
- AIDS TV: Identity, Community, and Alternative Video. Durham, NC: Duke University Press, 1995.
- "The Contained Threat: Women in Mainstream AIDS Documentary." Journal of Sex Research, 27:1, 1990. Special issue: Feminist Perspectives on Sexuality.
