= Anne Balsamo =

American academic and writer (born 1959)

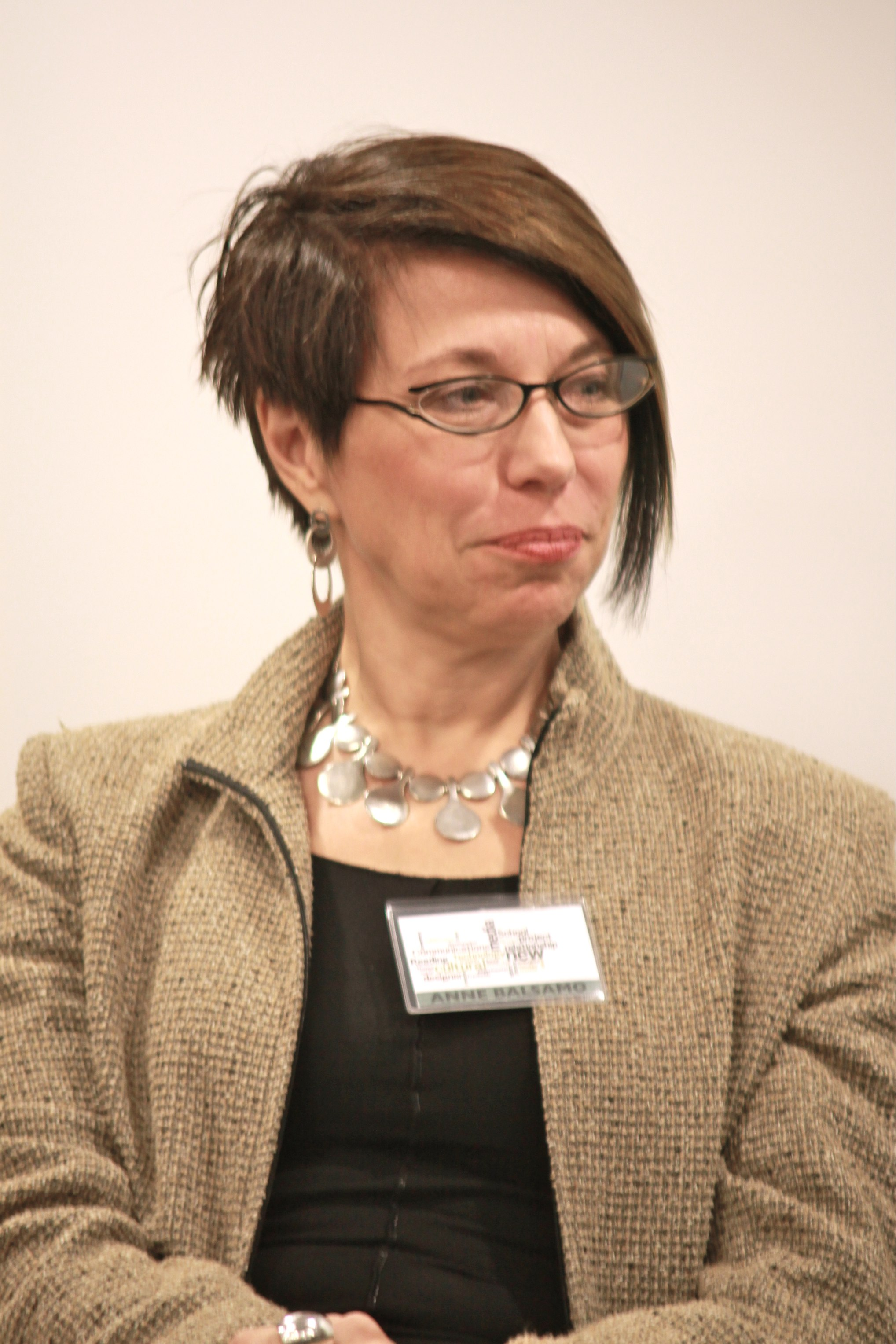
- At USC Creativity & Collaboration in 2010
- Born: Anne Marie Balsamo; January 7, 1959 (age 67)

Academic background
- Education: University of Illinois at Urbana-Champaign

Academic work
- Main interests: Connections between art, culture, gender, and technology

Anne Marie Balsamo (born January 7, 1959) is a scholar whose career encompasses contributions as a theorist, designer, educator, and entrepreneur in the fields of feminist technology studies, media studies, design research, public interactives, cultural heritage, and media archeology.

== Education ==
Balsamo attended graduate school at the University of Illinois at Urbana-Champaign where she earned her Ph.D. from the Institute of Communication Research with a major in Communications Research and a certificate in Cultural Studies from the Unit for Criticism and Interpretive Theory. Her dissertation was under the direction of Paula A. Treichler.

== Career ==
Anne Balsamo is the former Dean of the School of Arts Technology and Emerging Communication at the University of Texas at Dallas, she still serves as a Professor at the school. Previously she was Professor of media studies as well as Dean of the School of Media Studies at The New School for Public Engagement in New York City. Prior to that, Balsamo had concurrent appointments at the Annenberg School of Communication and Journalism and the Interactive Media Division of the School of Cinematic Arts at the University of Southern California, where she taught courses on interactive media, design, and technology. Also, at the Annenberg Innovation Lab, she oversaw Emergent Technologies. She was also the editor for an ebook series, Imprint, associated with Annenberg Press.

Previously she was a member of a research group called RED (Research on Experimental Documents) at Xerox PARC, where she worked on new kinds of reading devices, among other projects. An interactive exhibit on RED's work for which she was project manager and media designer toured U.S. science and technology museums from 2000 to 2003. She went on to co-found Onomy Labs, a Silicon Valley firm that designs interactive cultural technologies.

Balsamo has been an entrepreneur, author, educator, and new media designer at various times in her life but is best known as a writer who analyzes technology and culture from a feminist perspective. One of her books, Technologies of the Gendered Body, notoriously begins with the sentence: "My mother was a computer," underlining the fact that before 'computer' became a term for a machine, it was the term used for the people (mainly women) who kept the machines running and, in some cases, wrote programs for them. In particular, she addresses the technological control of women's bodies through, for example, cosmetic surgery or the medicalization of pregnancy.

Balsamo advocates for educational initiatives that expand access to the spheres in which future technologies are imagined and defined; along these lines, she and Alexandra Juhasz co-founded FemTechNet, a network of scholars and artists who work on issues related to technology and gender. John Seely Brown, former chief scientist of Xerox Corporation and Director of Xerox Palo Alto Research Center (PARC) argues that Balsamo "portrays both the necessity and the challenge of cultivating the technological imagination in all of us...Her insights into expanding the traditional considerations of socio-technical design to consider issues of culture are coming at a critical time." Lawrence Grossberg, author of Studies In the Future, argues that "Balsamo maps the concrete complexities of specific design processes, and opens up new ways of thinking about and teaching technocultures in relation to broader socio-political fields."

== Selected bibliography ==
=== Books ===
- Balsamo, Anne (1996). Technologies of the gendered body: reading cyborg women. Durham, North Carolina: Duke University Press. ISBN 9780822316985.
- Balsamo, Anne (2011). Designing culture: the technological imagination at work. Durham, North Carolina: Duke University Press. ISBN 9780822344452.

=== Chapters in books ===
- Balsamo, Anne (2013) [1995], "Signal to noise: on the meaning of cyberpunk subculture", in Biocca, Frank; Levy, Mark (eds.), Communication in the age of virtual reality, New York: Routledge, pp. 347–368, ISBN 9781135693572.
- Balsamo, Anne (1999), "Notes toward a reproductive theory of technology", in Kaplan, E. Ann; Squier, Susan (eds.), Playing dolly: technocultural formations, fantasies, & fictions of assisted reproduction, New Brunswick, New Jersey: Rutgers University Press, pp. 87–100, ISBN 9780813526492.
- Balsamo, Anne (2000), "Engineering cultural studies: the postdisciplinary adventures of mindplayers, fools, and others", in Traweek, Sharon; Reid, Roddey (eds.), Doing science + culture, New York: Routledge, pp. 259–274, ISBN 9780415921121.
- Balsamo, Anne (2000), "Teaching in the belly of the beast: feminism in the best of all places", in Sawchuk, Kim; Marcessault, Jeannine (eds.), Wild science: feminist cultural studies of science, technology and medicine, New York: Routledge, pp. 185–214, ISBN 9781136294501.

=== Journal articles ===
- Balsamo, Anne (1996). "Myths of information: on the meaning of new information technologies". Technology Analysis & Strategic Management. 8 (3): 341–348. doi:10.1080/09537329608524256.
- Balsamo, Anne (December 2005). "Taking culture seriously: educating and inspiring the technological imagination" (PDF). Academic Commons. Archived from the original (PDF) on June 20, 2022.
