= Jill Julius Matthews =

Australian feminist historian

- Born: 1949 (age 76–77); Adelaide, South Australia
- Occupations: Social and feminist historian

Academic background
- Education: University of Adelaide
- Thesis: Good and Mad Women: A study of Gender Order in South Australia 1920–1970 (1978)

Jill Julius Matthews (born 1949) is an Australian social and feminist historian. She is an emeritus professor in the College of Arts and Social Sciences at the Australian National University.

== Life and education ==
Matthews was born in Adelaide in 1949. She studied at Grange Primary School and then won a scholarship to Methodist Ladies' College, Adelaide. She went to the University of Adelaide where she began a law degree, then changed to arts/law and graduated with a Bachelor of Arts (Honours) in 1970.

While tutoring at Flinders University, Matthews began a PhD, supervised by Hugh Stretton, at the University of Adelaide. While completing her PhD, she worked as part-time tutor and lecturer at a number of tertiary institutions in Adelaide.

== Career ==
Matthews rewrote her PhD thesis to be published as Good and Mad Women: The Historical Construction of Femininity in Twentieth Century Australia by Allen & Unwin. In her 1987 review of the book, British historian Catherine Hall considered it to be an "essential starting point for British readers into the rapidly extending world of Australian feminist history."

Matthews was awarded a Nancy Keesing Fellowship by the State Library of New South Wales in 2004. Her 2005 book, Dance Hall and Picture Palace, won the prize for best monograph presented by the Film and History Association of Australia and New Zealand. It was also shortlisted for the Queensland Premier's Literary Award for History.

Her papers are held in the Australian National University Archives.

== Selected works ==
- Matthews, Jill Julius (1984). Good and mad women. The historical construction of femininity in twentieth-century Australia. Allen & Unwin Australia. ISBN 978-0-86861-657-5.
- Matthews, Jill Julius, ed. (1997). Sex in public: Australian sexual cultures. Allen and Unwin. ISBN 978-1-86448-049-8.
- Matthews, Jill Julius (2005). Dance hall & picture palace: Sydney's romance with modernity. Currency Press. ISBN 978-0-86819-755-5.
