= Roopika Risam =

Scholar of postcolonial digital humanities

- Risam at Boston Book Festival in 2026
- Education: Emory University (Ph.D.); Georgetown University (M.A.); University of Pennsylvania (M.A.)
- Occupations: Associate Professor, Dartmouth College
- Notable work: New Digital Worlds: Postcolonial Humanities in Theory, Praxis, and Pedagogy (2018)

Roopika Risam is an associate professor of film and media studies and of comparative literature and faculty in the Digital Humanities and Social Engagement cluster at Dartmouth College. She was formerly Chair of the Department of Secondary and Higher Education and Associate Professor of Education at Salem State University. She is a scholar of digital and postcolonial humanities.

== Education ==
In 2003, Risam earned her B.A. in Creative Writing and South Asian Studies from the University of Pennsylvania. She earned her M.A., with distinction, from Georgetown University in 2007 and her Ph.D. in English from Emory University in 2013.

== Work ==
Risam's work focuses on the intersections between postcolonial humanities and ethnic studies. She is the co-director of Reanimate, "an intersectional publishing collective that produces multimodal editions of archival writings by activist women in media." She has published articles in First Monday and Ada: A Journal of Gender, New Media, and Technology. She has also included writing in the Blackwell Encyclopedia of Postcolonial Studies and the Encyclopedia of Social Movement Media.

In 2018, Risam was awarded the inaugural Massachusetts Library Association's Civil Liberties Champion Award for her work on "Torn Apart/Separados", a digital humanities project documenting the sites of immigrant detention centers in the United States. She also released her first book, New Digital Worlds: Postcolonial Humanities in Theory, Praxis, and Pedagogy, from Northwestern University Press in 2018.

== Books ==
- New digital worlds : postcolonial digital humanities in theory, praxis, and pedagogy. Northwestern University Press, 2018.
- (ed. with Barbara Bordalejo) Intersectionality in Digital Humanities. ARC Humanities Press, 2019.
- (ed. with Rahul K. Gairola) South Asian digital humanities : postcolonial mediations across technology's cultural canon. Routledge, 2020.
- (ed. with Kelly Baker Josephs) The Digital Black Atlantic. University of Minnesota Press, 2021.
- Data Empire: The Power of Information to Organize, Control, and Dominate. Harper, 2026.
