= Elizabeth Losh =

American media theorist and rhetorician

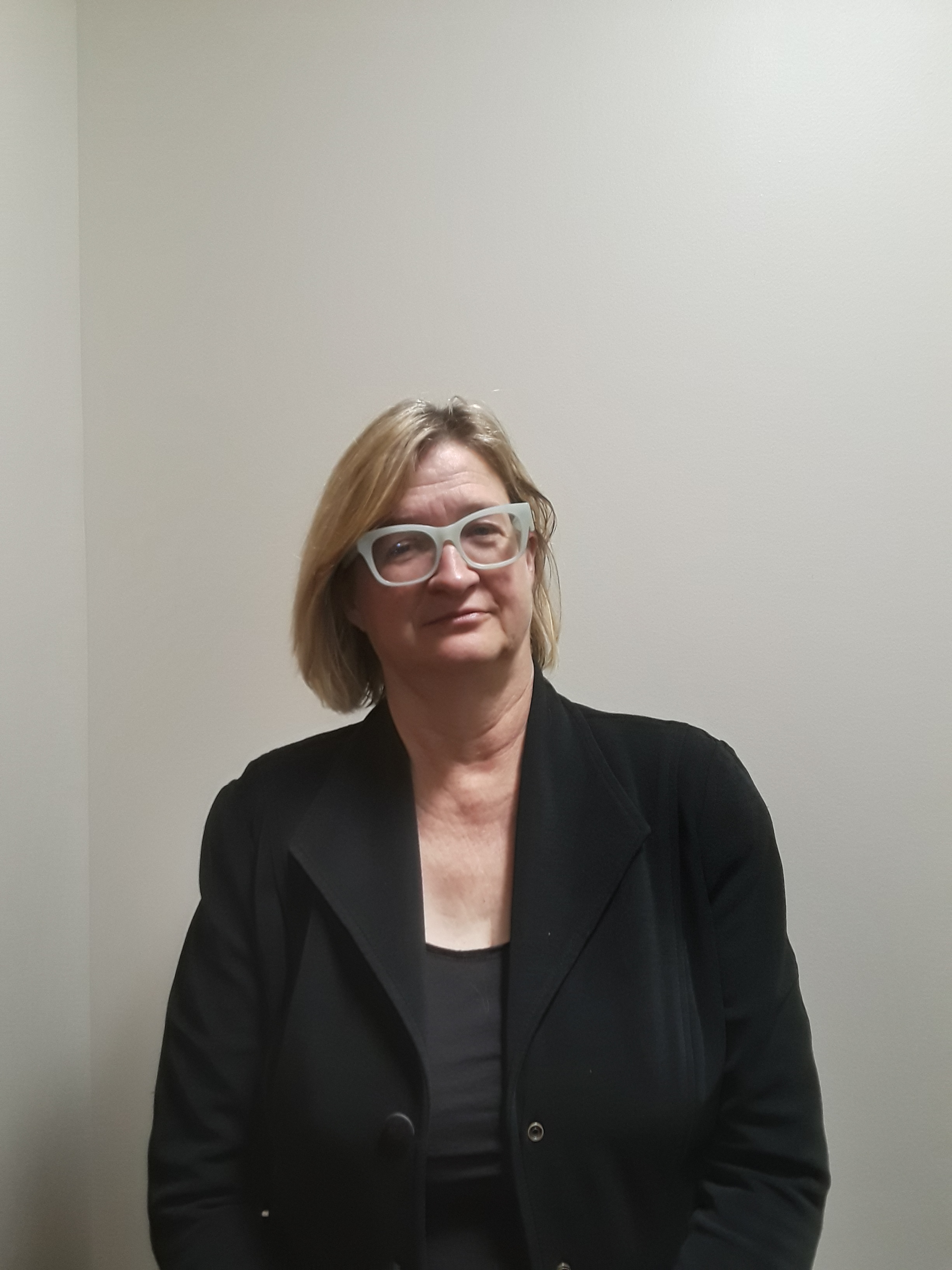
Portrait of Elizabeth Losh in November, 2018

Elizabeth Losh is a media theorist and digital rhetoric scholar, who is a professor of English and American Studies at the College of William & Mary.

== Education ==
Elizabeth Losh earned a Bachelor of Arts (magna cum laude) from Harvard University, a Master of Fine Arts in creative writing, and a PhD in English with an emphasis in critical theory from University of California, Irvine. She was Director of Academic Programs, Sixth College at University of California, San Diego, where she also taught in Communication, Visual Arts, and the Interdisciplinary Computing in the Arts major. She is a member of the editorial board of the journal Catalyst: Feminism, Theory, Technoscience.

== Academic contributions ==
Losh is a founding member of FemTechNet, an international organization devoted to promoting collaborative research, pedagogy and online learning innovation in feminist art, media and science and technology studies. In 2007, Losh was awarded the John Lovas Memorial Webblog prize. Losh's main areas of contribution are in interrogating the assumptions embedded in the rhetorics of news, information and pedagogy in digital media platforms and projects, particularly within online cultures and where online cultures intersect with spaces like classrooms and institutions like journalism.

== Publications ==
Losh is the author of books including The War on Learning: Gaining Ground in the Digital University, a book that, as Times Higher Education reviewer Tara Brabazon writes, addresses "what happens when education is treated like a product and not a process" and asks "who speaks for the students?". The London School of Economics Review of Books notes that Losh "effectively moves beyond the headlines and bestsellers that warn of literacy and attention crises among device-devoted youth, and those that dismiss the academy as a hopeless anachronism, to painstakingly deconstruct the 'rhetoric of crisis'".

With Jonathan Alexander, Losh is the author of a guide to writing that introduces graphics as a means of doing pedagogy: Understanding Rhetoric: A Graphic Guide to Writing. Losh is also the author of the Virtualpolitik: An Electronic History of Government Media-Making in a Time of War, Scandal, Disaster, Miscommunication, and Mistakes (MIT Press, 2009), a work highly recommended by Immersive Journalism for being a book that "closely examines the government’s digital rhetoric in such cases and its dual role as media-maker and regulator"
