= Networked feminism =

Online mobilization of feminists

Networked feminism is a phenomenon that can be described as the online mobilization and coordination of feminists in response to sexist, misogynistic, racist, and other discriminatory acts against minority groups. This phenomenon covers all possible definitions of what feminist movements may entail, as there have been multiple waves of feminist movements and there is no central authority to control what the term "feminism" claims to be. While one may hold a different opinion from another on the definition of "feminism", all those who believe in these movements and ideologies share the same goal of dismantling the current patriarchal social structure, where men hold primary power and higher social privileges above all others.

Networked feminism is not led by one singular women's group. Rather, it is the manifestation of feminists' ability to leverage the internet to make traditionally unrepresented voices and viewpoints heard. Networked feminism occurs when social network sites such as Facebook, Twitter, and Tumblr are used as a catalyst in the promotion of feminist equality and in response to sexism. Users of these social media websites promote the advancement of feminism using tools such as viral Facebook groups and hashtags. These tools are used to push gender equality and call attention to those promoting anything otherwise. Online feminist work is a new engine of contemporary feminism. With the possibility of connecting and communicating all around the world through the Internet, no other form of activism in history has brought together and empowered so many people to take action on a singular issue.

== Background ==
The mass convergence of feminists occurred as a result of a spike in the advancement of Internet usage and social media websites. Networked feminism is a part of the contemporary feminist community whose interests revolve around cyberspace, the Internet, and technology. This feminist community makes up the movement known as cyberfeminism. The beginnings of "online feminism were primarily in the form of online journals, websites, and blogs, developed in response to the need for a public platform where young women could voice their opinions about the state of the world around them". Women and men began creating spaces for themselves to voice out their opinions to create a public awareness of gender and race inequalities. As technology evolved, communication through the internet became more accessible. Nowadays, anyone who has access to the Internet has the capability to voice out their opinions across the globe. Web-based tools and platforms evolved to support the need of communication through the internet like YouTube, which allows for vlogging, or "video blogging". Social media blogging platforms like Twitter, Tumblr, and Instagram also allow for easier and more immediate sharing capabilities. Facebook is another, considered one of the largest social media platforms of communication, allowing many to use their 'profiles' and opinion dedicated 'groups' to voice their opinions around the world. The creation of these websites have allowed for feminists to take part in social media and other virtual coalitions that combat sexism, making way for networked feminism on a large scale.

These coalitions have resulted in increased vocabulary and awareness about gender in the United States' national media dialogue. According to a Score Media Metrix study in 2008, community-based women's websites were one of the fastest growing websites that year. Indeed, "the strongest flavor of networked activism today is deeply feminist. There is a tenacious, super-wired coalition of active feminists prepared at a moment's notice to blow the lid off sexist attacks or regressive health policy." Feminist blogs have thus provided a much needed service in keeping feminist issues at the forefront of the national and international discussion. Social media has seemingly helped render the present day as an opportune moment for women's activism and women's involvement in national politics. As famous feminist, writer and activist bell hooks notes, "Collaborating with diverse thinkers to work toward a greater understanding of the dynamics of race, gender, and class is essential for those of us who want to move beyond one dimensional ways of thinking, being, and living”.

== Social media ==
The use of hashtags has become an extremely important factor in the advancement of networked feminism and most all social media activist groups. The use of hashtags provides a means of grouping such messages, since one can search for the hashtag and get the set of messages that contain it. First appearing on the social media platform, Twitter, "the platform provides a search function where users can search keywords [or] hashtags." Since the creation of Twitter, the hashtag has spread onto other forms of social media like Facebook, YouTube, Tumblr, and Instagram. Feminist Internet users who participate in the virtual mass convergence of networked feminism use hashtags to form organized Internet groups that share the same hyperlink hashtag. In the case of feminist movements, groups are used to advance an idea or coalition against sexism and the dismantling of the patriarchal system. This activism using tools found on the Internet, particularly the tool of the hashtag, is now called hashtag activism.

Facebook allows users to interact through friend requests, networks, and groups. A group on Facebook is created to represent anything from a common interest that people share all the way to a coalition that people associate themselves with. In the case of networked feminism, discussions have been held in Facebook groups regarding feminist issues and creating bonds against or for a certain topic that revolves around sexism or, on the other hand, the advancement of feminism. Individuals have used these groups, along with other forms of social media and interconnectedness, such as email lists, blogs, YouTube videos, reddit threads, to create forums where feminists can virtually congregate. These forums created an open gateway for the mass virtual convergence that is networked feminism.

== Examples ==
Through the lightning fast connectivity that is now available through the Internet, communicating ideas like feminist movements has brought about large opportunities to face larger public figures and corporations that hold or have held discriminatory acts against minority groups. More prominent feminist bloggers Vanessa Valenti and Courtney E. Martin have said in their 2012 report Online Revolution that, "Contrary to media depictions of online activity as largely narcissistic and/or 'slactivism,' young women across the country—and all over the world, in fact—are discovering new ways to leverage the Internet to make fundamental progress in the unfinished revolution of feminism."

=== Body Peace Treaty with Seventeen magazine ===
Fourteen-year-old Julia Bluhm from Waterville, Maine, started a protest on Change.org with the petition name "Seventeen Magazine: Give Girls Images of Real Girls". This protest requested that Seventeen magazine would print one unaltered photo spread per month. Activists, many of whom were teenage girls, demanded that Seventeen magazine stop using Photoshopped and altered images of women and girls, arguing that these images can lead to unrealistic body ideals and subjected many girls to developing extreme dieting, eating disorders, depression and low self-esteem. The online petition created by Bluhm gathered over 80,000 signatures, bolstered by postings on Twitter and Facebook garnered intense media coverage. Protesters as well gathered outside of Seventeen magazine's New York Offices by holding a mock photo shoot to honor what real girls look like.

In May 2012, Bluhm, her mother and a group of other teen girls delivered the petition and its 80,000 plus signatures to the Seventeen magazine headquarters in New York City. After the presentation, editor in chief Ann Shoket made the announcement in her editor's letter in the August issue of 2012 that Seventeen magazine had vowed to "celebrate every kind of beauty" and feature "real girls and models who are healthy. Shoket's editor's letter was presented as a "Body Peace Treaty", promising to "never change girl's body or faces shapes" when retouching images. This Seventeen magazine protest reached a far greater number of people through the internet, undoubtedly raising the unconsciousness of thousands, most of whom never set foot in New York.

=== Rush Limbaugh's social media defeat ===
Sandra Fluke, a then 30-year-old law student at Georgetown University spoke in front of the House Democratic Steering and Policy Committee regarding the new Administration rules on Conscience Clause exceptions in health care. In her speech, Fluke discussed the reasons that her educational institution, a Catholic university, should offer contraceptives without any co-pay. She then went on to say that 40% of Georgetown Law School's female population suffered financial hardship as a result of birth control not being covered by the student health insurance plan.

In response to Flukes' testimony, Rush Limbaugh made some controversial remarks regarding Fluke. On February 29, 2012, Limbaugh was recorded on his talk show calling Sandra Fluke a "slut" and a "prostitute" as a result of her speech.

Immediately after Limbaugh's comments went public on his radio show, Limbaugh was criticized by feminists on social media. Internet users created Facebook groups and Twitter hashtags that demanded action be taken against Limbaugh and that he be reprimanded. These Facebook groups and Twitter hashtags directly targeted the barter ads that aired commercials during Limbaugh's radio show. As a result of the massive virtual feminist coalition against Limbaugh, Premiere Networks, the radio group that syndicates The Rush Limbaugh Show, pulled all of its barter ads from the group's affiliated stations from March 12, 2012, through March 23, 2012. Even further, the Internet network created against Limbaugh was so great that it sparked President Obama to express his opinion on Limbaugh's comments, deeming them to be "inappropriate".

After the loss of many of his advertisers, along with the desolation of his reputation via social media, Limbaugh issued an apology to Fluke, stating that he "chose the wrong words" and he "did not mean a personal attack on Ms. Fluke".

The actions taken against Limbaugh by his advertisers were a direct result of the feminist network that created a coalition against his sexist actions.

=== Mitt Romney and "binders full of women" ===
On October 16, 2012, Mitt Romney and President Obama participated in the 2nd Presidential debate at Hofstra University in Hempstead, New York. An audience member asked the candidates a question regarding inequalities in the workplace. Romney responded by stating, "well, gosh, can't we—can't we find some—some women that are also qualified?' And—and so we—we took a concerted effort to go out and find women who had backgrounds that could be qualified to become members of our cabinet. I went to a number of women's groups and said: 'Can you help us find folks,' and they brought us whole binders full of women."

Romney's comment went viral it sparked outrage from feminists in the United States. For instance, a Twitter account was created solely for the purpose of poking fun at Romney and his comments—"@Romneys_Binder" and eventually reached up to 13,000 followers. A Facebook group was created with the title "Binders Full of Women" where Facebook users were able to mock Romney's comments or express their anger and disdain with them. Lastly, the Twitter hashtag "#bindersfullofwomen" became a trending topic on Twitter and the phrase also was the third-fastest rising search on Google during the televised debate. Furthermore, Internet memes were also created expressing the apparent sexism in Romney's comment.

=== Susan G. Komen and Planned Parenthood ===
In February 2012, the public was notified that breast cancer activist organization Susan G. Komen for the Cure had decided to cut funding to Planned Parenthood. As a result of the organization's decision to cut funding, a networked response was sparked that focused on the war on women's health. In this case, female Internet users, even those who did not identify themselves as feminists, expressed their outrage, again using social media as their main catalyst. Media outlets described this backlash as one of the most organized feminist Internet coalitions in history and called it extra-organizational with their extremely savvy use of social media. Individual women used a variety of Internet channels to connect with other women and create their own protests. Many angry protesters stated that they were cut their funding to the breast cancer organization and donate straight to Planned Parenthood instead.

As a result of the overwhelming virtual mass convergence of feminists that came together because of the organization's choice to cut funding to Planned Parenthood, Susan G. Komen reversed their decision and began refunding the non-profit organization. This demonstrated how powerful and hyper-organized networked feminist organizations can be.

=== #NotOkay Movement ===
The #NotOkay movement recently became popularized after Donald Trump's vulgar comment during the presidential debate that took place on October 8, 2016. These comments alluded to a tape from his past that described sexual assaults that he had personally committed and how he treated women. This sparked a chain of tweets featuring the tag #NotOkay, after Canadian Writer, Kelly Oxford prompted many to tweet their own experiences. Oxford's tweet, resulted in millions of responses and became one of the top trending tags within hours. She started off by writing a discrete version of her first experience dealing with sexual assault. Within a day, Oxford tweeted, "women have tweeted me sexual assault stories for 14 hours straight. Minimum 50 per minute. Harrowing. Do not ignore. #notokay".

Among all these accounts a trend transpired, noting that people who held power committed most of these written assaults. Individuals most commonly associated with leadership positions such as pastors, camp counselors, doctors, supervisors, and teachers were allegedly the most common suspects of these sexual harassment cases. Additionally, most of these incidents involved groping, child abuse, and violent rapes at extremely young ages such as seven or eight years old.

On another note, this movement was not created as recently as it has been perceived. Originally, the #NotOkay movement was established around November 25, 2014, in Canada. It made its debut alongside the annual Rose Campaign, which was hosted by YWCA Canada. Although the notokay.ca website was put into place, the movement was mainly ignited through social media, specifically using Twitter as its prime platform. Currently located on the notokay.ca page are various tools that individuals can use to bring about awareness for sexual assault such as profile pictures and descriptive and simple banners that can be used on social media platforms such as Facebook and Twitter. Towards the bottom of the homepage are also short clips of popular videos, describing examples of sexual assault and harassment.

=== #MeToo movement ===
Originally created in 2006, the Me Too movement began to spread virally in October 2017 as a hashtag on social media in an attempt to demonstrate the widespread prevalence of sexual assault and harassment, especially in the workplace. The initial viral breakout began in response to widespread exposure of accusations of predatory behavior by film magnate Harvey Weinstein, but quickly involved others in Hollywood, the music industry, science, academia, and politics, and soon spread to many countries around the world.

== Networked antifeminism ==
Antifeminism includes beliefs such as hostility towards women's rights, the belief that the disadvantages suffered by women in society are incorrect or are myths, or that feminism as a movements seeks to harm or oppress men. The meaning of antifeminism has varied across time and cultures and continues to vary through different opinions found under this ideology, just as much as the multitude of feminist ideologies. In the 19th century, antifeminism mainly focused on the opposition of the suffrage movement, which battled for the right for women to vote. As well, in the 20th century antifeminists argued whether higher education or entry into the work force was right for women. Both of these views, while seen in the past, are still seen in the present.

The rejection of the feminist ideologies sometimes is due to the often misinterpreted ideologies of feminisms. Views from more radical feminists and stereotyped views of feminism, most antifeminists view those who hold feminist ideologies are those who are against men and may group all men into the category of rapists, monsters, and enemies. This view has become so prolific that many women and men now refuse to identify as such due to the negative stigma attached to the word, even if they are feminists or believe in equality across all groups of minorities. Nowadays, 21st century antifeminists can be seen focusing on the rejection of all feminist ideologies, with some subscribing to the ideology of humanism rather than feminism. According to the 2002 Amsterdam Declaration of the World Humanist Congress, humanism "affirms the worth, dignity, and autonomy of the individual" against religious and political dogmas. However, humanism's foundations were first created in the Age of Enlightenment of the 18th century, A cultural and intellectual movement of the Renaissance that emphasized human potential to attain excellence and promoted direct study of the literature, art, and civilization of classical Greece and Rome. Judith Butler explains that humanism "supposes that there is one single idea of what it is to be human". Therefore, humanism turns away from difference and diversity and does not create opportunities for all social groups to be considered equal.

The first wave of feminism is thought to mainly belong to the suffragettes who were women and men political activists who fought for the right for women to vote who were active mainly in the 19th century. Antifeminists commonly believe that this movement that was started by the suffragettes was only necessary in the 1920s, and now most antifeminists believe that this movement is no longer needed today and is a thing of the past. Most antifeminists also believe that the wage gap between men and women is a made-up myth to support a no longer necessary and outdated movement and is only now current as a movement oppositional to the male sex.

With the continual growth of misconceptions behind the goals of feminist movements, the connectivity of the Internet and social media platforms are commonly used as debate grounds over the truths or falsities behind this often misinterpreted ideology. There is currently a plethora of websites that discuss the topic of antifeminism, using the hashtag of the famous social media campaign Women Against Feminism. On social media platforms like YouTube and Tumblr, numerous male and female users explain in their videos why they are against feminism. Women and men also post pictures of themselves, or selfies, holding messages like "I don't need feminism because..." Their arguments of why they may not need feminism can range. Some messages may read "I don't need feminism because I love my boyfriend and we both respect each other"; "I don't need feminism because I want to promise my man to love him, honor him and obey him"; or "I don't need feminism because I have the same equal rights as men".

== Feminist debates and internal issues ==
While the Internet and social media platforms are used to branch out and communicate ideas to others around the globe, the Internet is a place of no secrecy and anyone who has access to the Internet can view and comment on someone's posted opinions and beliefs. One article published in The Nation described the "toxic" backlash that feminist activists may face when participating in debates on feminist issues on blog sites and social media accounts due to the "slashing righteousness of more radical feminists". Katherine Cross, a Puerto Rican transgender woman, has written that she "fears being cast suddenly as one of the 'bad guys' for being insufficiently radical, too nuanced or too forgiving, or for simply writing whose offensive dimensions would be unknown to me at the time of publication". Though the Internet can facilitate communication, "Online harassment and threats are a daily experience for online activists, and young women and girls are increasingly bombarded with vitriolic and harmful messaging on the very same forums [they] use for activism".

== Criticism ==
Rebecca Sive of The Sive Group, Inc. in Chicago indicated in a May 2012 article on Reproductive Health Reality Check's website that she believes "new networked feminism is just like the old networked feminism", because both its method and measures of success are the same. Sive states that "in order to achieve institutional change, women have always talked, networked, and connected to get organized", but the medium is just different with new networked feminism. Sive seemingly implies that widespread feminist movements occur when women collectively decide institutional change is necessary, and then use the most appropriate and effective mediums to achieve this change. Thus, mediums do not inspire change, they just help facilitate it.

Additionally, although social media has helped raise awareness about feminism and women's issues, "there's still the concern of creating an echo chamber", says Nona Willis-Aronowitz, author of Girl Drive: Criss-crossing America, Redefining Feminism. Arnowitz states that there is incredible diversity among women and men about what exactly feminism means, making it harder to classify what does and does not constitute new networked feminism.

== Digital divide ==
Networked feminism's impact is somewhat limited because not everyone has access to the internet. According to Samhita Mukhopadhyay, the executive editor of Feministing, a popular feminist blog, "we tend to forget the women who aren't online – there is a digital divide – and I think that part of the feminist movement should be focused on reaching out to people face-to-face doing community work, doing international work. A lot of people are online but not everybody, not by a long shot."

== See also ==
- Internet activism
- Slacktivism
- FemTechNet
