= Rich Gossweiler =

Research scientist

- Citizenship: American
- Education: University of Virginia
- Scientific career
- Fields: Human-computer interaction Social computing
- Workplaces: SGI; PARC; IBM Almaden Research Center; NASA Ames; Hewlett-Packard; Google
- Thesis: Perception-Based Time Critical Rendering (1996)
- Doctoral advisor: Randy Pausch
- Website: www.richgossweiler.com

Rich Gossweiler is a research scientist with Google whose area of expertise is in HCI, interaction design, front-end web development, and System architecture.

== Education ==
Gossweiler graduated from the College of William and Mary, majoring in Computer Science and minoring in mathematics. He received both his master's degree and Ph.D. from the University of Virginia, focusing on computer science and perceptual psychology in relation to 3D graphics and VR. He was Randy Pausch's first Ph.D. student.

== Career ==
Gossweiler is currently researching new search models, user experiences and collaborative applications for Google. He has worked at Hewlett-Packard, IBM Almaden Research Center, Xerox PARC, SGI and NASA where he worked at NASA Ames participating in the Mars Exploration Rover (MER) mission.
