= FemTechNet =

Interdisciplinary feminist network

FemTechNet (FTN) is a feminist network of scholars, artists, and activists known for its feminist, decentralized pedagogy experiments. FemTechNet became the focus of various media outlets when it broadcast its efforts to "storm" Wikipedia under its "wikistorming" initiative. Beyond its 2013 Wikipedia project, FemTechNet has been described as "a new approach to collaborative learning", and a "feminist anti-MOOC." Through its website, FemTechNet provides "resources for learning more about feminism, cyberfeminism, and feminist theories of technology, including videos with major scholars and subject matter experts, reading lists and bibliographies, projects to do with classmates or undertake on your own as a do-it-yourselfer, and syllabi from past and present FemTechNet classes."

== Background ==
The network began in Southern California in 2012 with Anne Balsamo and Alexandra Juhasz as co-founders and co-facilitators. FemTechNet describes itself as “an activated network of scholars, artists and students who work on, with, and at the borders of technology, science and feminism in a variety of fields including STS, Media and Visual Studies, Art, Women's, Queer and Ethnic Studies.” In a peer-reviewed concept paper, the founders more concretely described the project as one of interdisciplinary community building.

Distributed open collaborative courses (DOCC), FemTechNet's primary initiative, uses networked technologies in many innovative ways, including developing “nodal” classes around shared themes that are augmented by video discussions available on FemTechNet's website by participating university instructors. The first DOCC, "Dialogues in Feminism and Technology," was initiated in 2013 as for-credit courses at the following institutions:

- Rutgers University
- The New School
- CUNY
- University of California at San Diego
- University of Illinois
- Ohio State University
- Bowling Green State University
- Pitzer College
- Colby-Sawyer College
- Penn State University
- California Polytechnic University
- Ontario College of Art and Design
- Brown University
- Yale University
- California State University, Fullerton

Non-traditional students take the course via the FTN website's free, self-directed learner component. In 2014 - 2015 the second Distributed Open Collaborative Course (DOCC) series was offered at the following nodes.

In 2013 FemTechNet launched "Storming Wikipedia", which aimed to encourage students to engage in Wikipedia editing. Described as a response to Wikipedia's gender imbalance, the assignment is also used to highlight "the significant contributions of feminists to technology". "Wikistorming" got the attention of mainstream media networks, including a story by Fox News and CampusReform.org, which derisively framed the effort as counter-factual.

== See also ==
- Cyberfeminism
- Feminist technoscience
- Networked feminism
