= Ésope (operating system) =

Ésope ("Aesop") is a discontinued experimental time-sharing operating system for the Scientific Data Systems Sigma 7 and its French clone, the CII 10070.

Ésope was a project of the French Institute for Research in Computer Science and Automation (IRIA) aimed at using virtual memory and resource sharing to enable simultaneous access to computers from 1968 until 1974, at a time when the shortage of computing power in France was being addressed by Plan Calcul.

Henri Boucher, a general engineer of the French Armaments Department, who oversaw the army's computer control systems during the 1960s, named the project Exploitation simultanée d'un ordinateur et de ses périphériques ("Simultaneous Operation of a Computer and its Peripherals - ÉSOPE") and recruited two Navy engineers for it: Sacha Krakowiak in May 1968, then Claude Kaiser in 1969, part-time. These were later joined by other Navy engineers, serving in one of the six autonomous "research departments" created at IRIA, called Structure et programmation des Calculateurs ("Structure and Programming of Computers"). The program suffered departures in 1972, when the CII and IRIA preferred the competing project SAM, and was then discontinued in 1974.

Meanwhile, in 1971, Henri Boucher "was eliminated" from IRIA, according to him after "episodes that are best left undescribed, given the processes employed." This was also the case for some of its researchers who found themselves at the Navy Programming Center at the time when "a new theme is introduced", which Henri Boucher "refused" to take charge of, for the study of the French CYCLADES packet switching network, entrusted to Louis Pouzin at the same time, a period which also saw the entry into the board of directors of the young mathematician Alain Bensoussan, researcher on Multics systems, and "piloted from afar" by Lions. Before Henri Boucher's departure, the IRIA Computing Centre was "obviously equipped with CII equipment", such as the Iris 50, with its successor, the Iris 80, only arriving afterwards.
