= CII 10070 =

The CII 10070 is a discontinued computer system from the French company CII. It was part of the first series of computers manufactured in the late 1960s under Plan Calcul.

The 10070 is a rebadged Scientific Data Systems (SDS) Sigma 7. In addition to the Sigma software, a new operating system was developed by teams from INRIA.

The 10070 is optimized for scientific calculation. It has 32-bit words, byte addressing, and 16 index registers. It can handle both batch processing, and time-sharing. It also has mémoire topographique as a standard feature, similar to virtual memory except that it is only intended for instant memory-to-memory remapping for performance reasons, with no support for managing swapping to disk. This is managed by the time-sharing monitor.

The 10070 served as the basis for the design of the Iris 50 and Iris 80 series, which were entirely manufactured by CII.

== Software ==
=== Operating systems ===
The CII 10070 runs several SDS and locally developed operating systems:

- BPM (Batch Processing Monitor), single-stream batch processing system with independent tasks, called symbionts, to process card and printer inputs and outputs. This system was supplied by SDS.
- BTM time sharing system from SDS.
- Siris 7 from CII, a version of Siris 8 for the Iris 80.
- An experimental system, Ésope, was developed at IRIA.

=== Languages and utilities ===
Most of the software for the 10070 also came from SDS:

- Fortran IV H compiler
- Symbol (assembly language)
- Metasymbol, a more powerful assembler
- COBOL compiler
- PL/I compiler (Note: There is no record of a PL/I compiler from SDS)
- Sort
- CII Document retrieval system: Mistral

== See also ==
- CII Iris 50
- CII Iris 80
- SDS Sigma series
