= Full-text database =

Database that contains complete texts

A full-text database (or complete-text database) is a database that contains the full text of books, dissertations, journals, magazines, newspapers or other textual documents. It differs from bibliographic databases, which typically contain only bibliographic metadata and sometimes abstracts, and from other non-bibliographic databases such as directories and numeric databases.

One of the earliest systems of this type was IBM STAIRS, introduced in 1973.

Full-text databases became more widespread around 1990, when advances in computer storage and processing made large-scale text storage and retrieval more practical. Two main categories are often distinguished: extensions of traditional bibliographic database systems into full-text systems (for example, on hosts such as BRS, Dialog, LexisNexis, and Westlaw) and Internet-based full-text systems, which are typically documented using search engines or structured document formats such as XML.

== See also ==
- Digital library
- Full-text search

== Bibliography ==
- Baeza-Yates, Ricardo; Ribeiro-Neto, Berthier (1999). Modern Information Retrieval. Addison-Wesley.
- Manning, Christopher D.; Raghavan, Prabhakar; Schütze, Hinrich (2008). Introduction to Information Retrieval. Cambridge University Press.
- Salton, Gerard; Buckley, Christopher (1983). Introduction to Modern Information Retrieval. McGraw-Hill.
- Silberschatz, Avi; Korth, Henry F.; Sudarshan, S. (2019). Database System Concepts. McGraw-Hill.
- Tenopir, Carol & Ro, Jung Soon (1990). Full Text Databases. New York: Greenwood Press.
