= XOS =

XOS or Xos may refer to:

== Computing ==
- XOS (operating system), an Android-based mobile OS
- Xbox One S, a video game console
- Xerox Operating System, for XDS Sigma computers
- XOS 3.0/4.0/5.0, Red Hat Enterprise Linux derivatives

== Other uses ==
- XOS valuation, in mathematics
- Xylooligosaccharide, a polymer of the sugar xylose
- Xos, Inc., an American manufacturer of electric trucks

== See also ==
- XDOS (disambiguation)
