= Mistral (software) =

Mistral is an information retrieval system designed and produced by the French company CII in the 1970s, which quickly became known internationally.

== History ==
Mistral was created in 1970 to meet the needs of CNEXO (now IFREMER). This version was still rudimentary and was designed for a time when disk space was very expensive, and therefore used magnetic tapes and only sequential processing was allowed.

Subsequently, CII considered Mistral a flagship product for the Iris 80 and Iris 50 systems and maintained a strong development team. It was able to produce a series of versions which brought significant improvements, for example:

- Transition from tape to magnetic disk
- Thesaurus introduction,
- Indexing of free-form text fields,
- Interactive mode, first in transaction mode then in time-sharing.

In 1978, Mistral was chosen for the creation of a "national server center" (centre serveur national), Télésystemes Questel.

After 1977, Mistral was ported to Honeywell GCOS7 and GCOS8.

Paradoxically, this success led to the gradual end of Mistral's life. Part of the initial team joined this new company. On the other hand, with the tribulations of CII, the support was more reduced. Finally, the use of this software by a documentation center seemed complex, and products that were less efficient but easier to access, and in particular Texto, multiplied.

== Technical characteristics ==
=== Bibliographic file ===
Mistral manages bibliographic records which are stored in bibliographic files. Entries are stuructured as a set of fields which can be of three types:

- reference — mandatory and unique, it contains a key allowing the record to be uniquely designated;
- monovalued — field whose content is reduced to a single value (for example the title);
- multivalued — field whose content consists of a list of values separated by a separator (configurable), for example an author field.

=== Inverted files ===
Mistral works with an inverted index structure which is implemented as indexed sequential files. The configuration provides some flexibility by allowing, for example, the grouping together several fields in the same index. The software package has a set of tools for managing or reorganizing these files.

== See also ==
- IBM STAIRS
- SPIRES
- BRS/Search
