= Sigma 6 =

Sigma 6 may refer to:

- G.I. Joe: Sigma 6, a line of military-themed action figures and toys
- SDS Sigma 6, one of the SDS Sigma series of computers made by Scientific Data Systems
- Pink Floyd, an English rock group originally called Sigma 6

== See also ==
- Six Sigma, a set of techniques and tools for process improvement
- 68–95–99.7 rule, or Three sigma rule, in statistics
