= Mitra 15 =

Minicomputer sold from 1971 to 1985

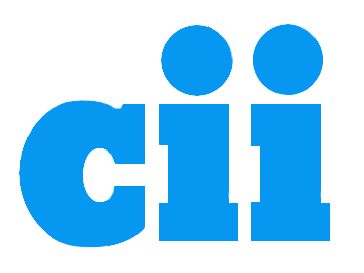

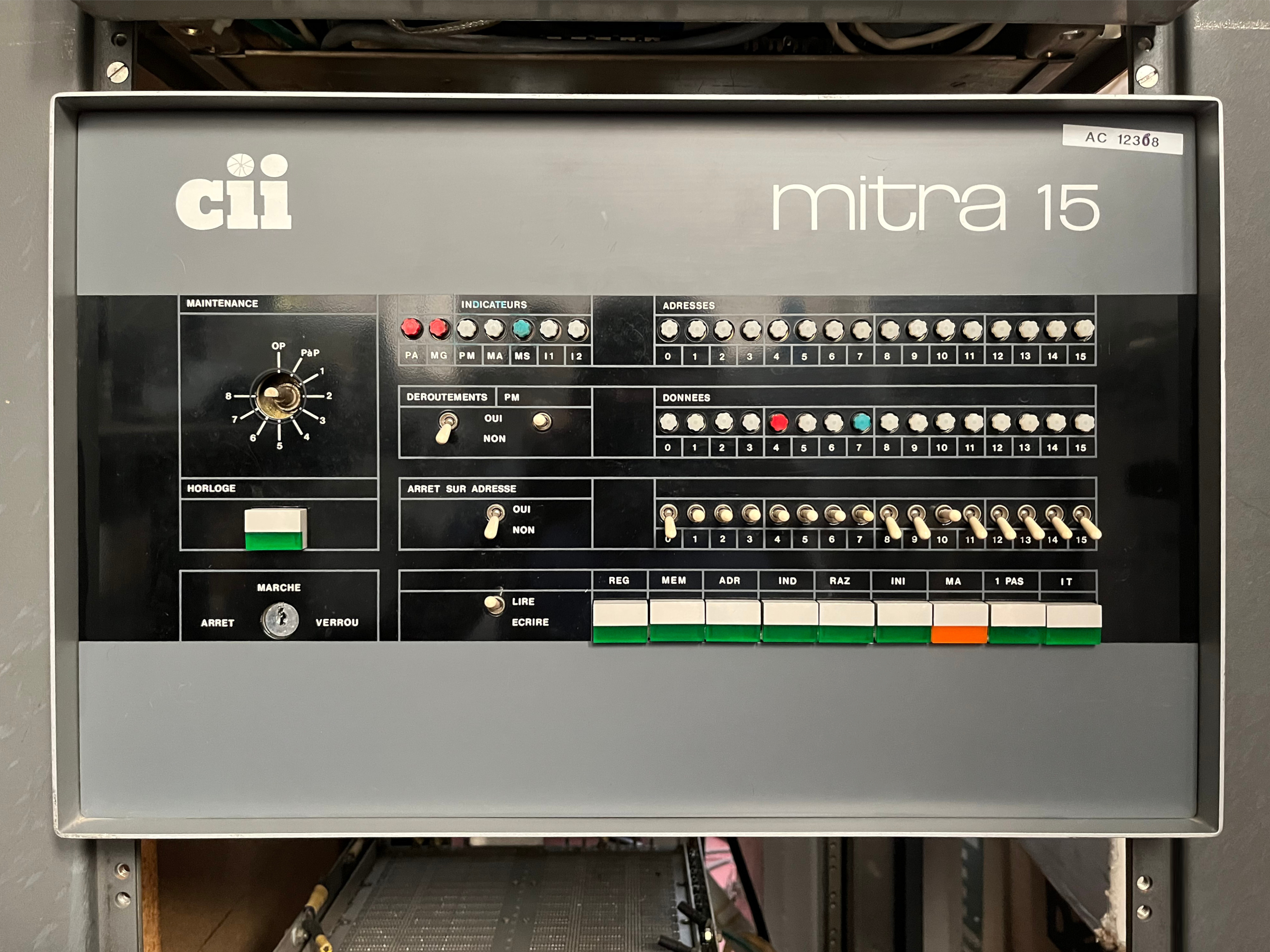
- Front panel of a Mitra 15, from the collection of ACONIT Museum, Grenoble
- Developer: Compagnie Internationale d'Informatique (CII)
- Product family: Minicomputer
- Generation: 3rd
- Released: 1971
- Discontinued: 1985
- Units sold: About 8000 (7929)
- Operating system: Siris 8
- CPU: 16 bits, real-time (32 interruptions level), upgradeable microcode, made of TTL cards plugged onto a backplane @ 800ns memory cycle (1.25 MHz)
- Memory: (Core memory, 32 kilowords of 16 bits words (64 KB))
- Storage: DRI hard drive (5 MB fixed, 5 MB removable) Later, 50 MB hard drive
- Input: Teletype, Ethernet, Minitel
- Predecessor: CII 10010, CII 10020
- Successor: Mitra 125, Mitra 225

The Mitra 15 is a minicomputer made by the French company CII under Plan Calcul, along with the Iris 50 and Iris 80 mainframe computers. It was marketed from 1971 to 1985 and could function in conjunction with large systems. CII manufactured a thousand Mitra 15 machines until 1975 in its Toulouse factory, then in Crolles in the suburbs of Grenoble. A total of 7,929 units were built, most of them for the French market, with a small number sold in Australia, Indonesia, and in other European countries.

== History ==
The Mitra 15 is the successor to the CII 10010, also called Iris 10, a 16-bit minicomputer released in July 1967. At the time, CII also produced another 16-bit minicomputer, the CII 10020 (actually a licensed Sigma 3 from SDS) and wanted to replace them both with a new, more powerful design compatible with the latest offering of the company. The Mitra 15 was designed from the outset to complement and network with the most powerful French computer of the time, the CII Iris 80, with which it was compatible. Its name is an acronym of Mini-machine pour l'Informatique Temps Réel et Automatique, meaning “Mini-machine for Real-Time and Automatic Computing”. The first versions featured a main memory of lithium ferrite cores organized in 16-bit words. It was designed and developed by a team led by Alice Recoque.

The first Mitra 15 was delivered on May 10, 1971, and produced in Crolles then Échirolles.

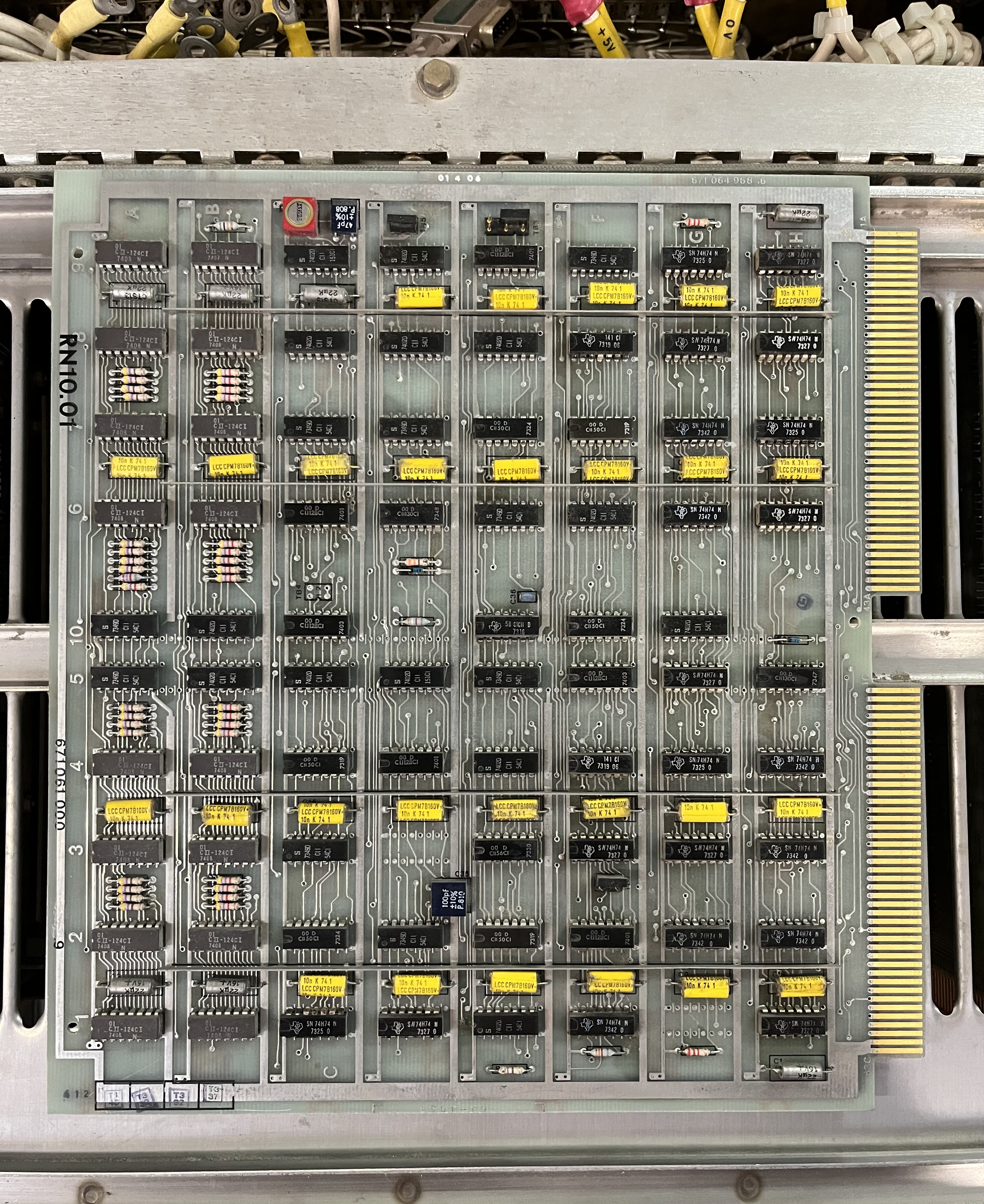
Close up on one of the processor board of the Mitra 15 minicomputer

Intended for command and control of industrial processes such as scientific computing, the Mitra 15 was designed to be adaptable to very diverse fields of application, thanks to an innovative microprogramming system and a good price/performance ratio. Variants of this computer have also been produced according to the needs of CII's customers. The Mitra 15 was also developed into a militarized version, the Mitra 15M. Microprograms use firmware stored in a ROM, the execution of which causes a simple computer (the micromachine) to always execute the same algorithm, for the instructions of another computer: the macromachine, or simply the machine, which is what is visible to the programmer.

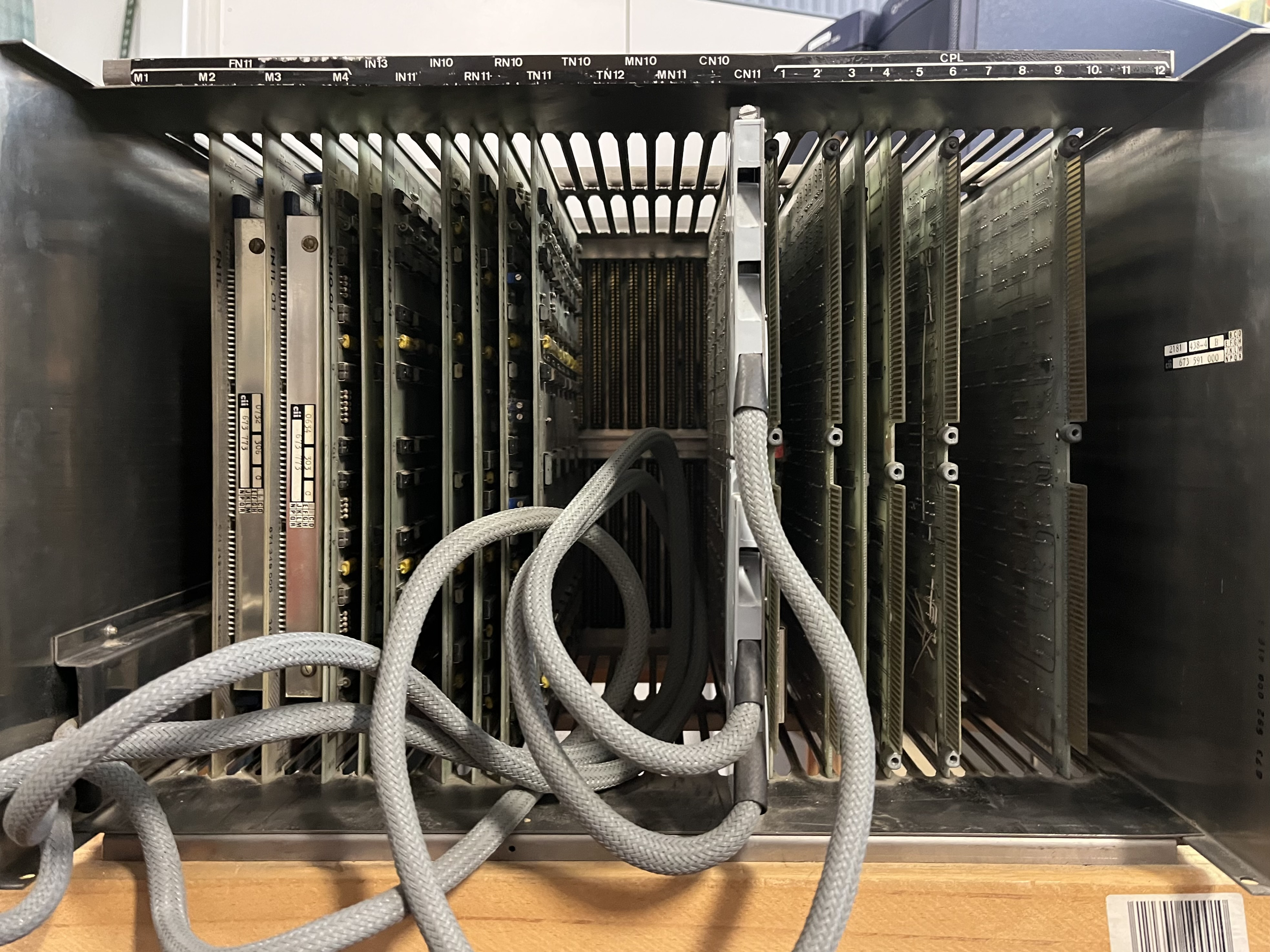
Back view of the Mitra 15 minicomputer

Only the first version is incompatible with the CII Iris computers of the time, the Iris 50. The Mitra 15 was widely used as the front-end for the CII Iris 80 (MCR-2) computer. Initially, it was produced as a simple stand-alone module with external cabinetry. It was succeeded by the Mitra 15–20, Mitra 15–30, and Mitra 15–35, produced from 1972. The Mitra 15-30 and Mitra 15-35 which have an external chassis cabinet with extended configuration and modular drawers are intended in particular for customers in the telecommunications industry; they were priced from the equivalent to $100,060 in 2025 dollars. Later, the low-end Mitra 15M/05 was produced in 1975.

== Competition and innovation ==
The first commercially-successful minicomputer, the 12-bit DEC PDP-8 was introduced in 1965, and sold for US$16,000 (equivalent to $163,464 in 2025). In 1969, Data General, founded by ex-DEC engineers introduced the 16-bit Nova, which sold for US$3,995 (equivalent to $35,074 in 2025). The Hewlett-Packard HP2000 series appeared in the late 1960s and early 1970s.

The main French competitor to the Mitra 15 were the Télémécanique T1600 [fr], introduced in 1971, and its successor, the Solar 16 [fr] in 1975, which sold in about 16 000 units.

According to Le Monde, by 1974 the Mitra 15 had achieved revenue of 150 million francs; one eighth of the total sales of the CII, of which "30% was for remote processing" and "around 20%" for export.

== Users ==
=== Cyclades packet-switching network ===
Cyclades was an early packet-switching network developed by Louis Pouzin in the early 1970s, which played a significant role in the development of the Internet. It used a decentralized approach where Mitra 15 minicomputers acted as routers and allowed for the transmission of data in small packets. Cyclades was a forerunner of the Transmission Control Protocol (TCP).

=== French nuclear program ===
The Mitra 15 was used to monitor the deployment of the use of the new generation of electric generators from Électricité de France, during the French nuclear program. In particular, it was used as part of the transmission network automation master plan, launched in 1973.

The Mitra 15 gradually equipped all of the network's control sites – about a hundred in France – to ensure and manage data exchanges between the remote control equipment of the sites ordered and the regional nodes which control the control of the electricity network. In 1975, EDF 's Mitra 15s were systematically fitted with monitors and printers.

=== PTT telecom network ===
Within the French PTT telecom network, the Mitra 15 was used with CII Iris 80s, due to its ability to handle a large number of interrupts.

=== Telecom switches ===
The Mitra 15 equipped the telephone switches of the E10N4 between 1972 and 1976, sold by CIT-Alcatel to the PTT. After 1976, because of the lowering of component prices, a fully electronic 2nd generation global telephone switch system, based on new integrated circuits, became affordable.

=== Experimental computer science in secondary education ===
As part of Plan Calcul, tt was then decided to install computers, on an experimental basis, in 58 high schools. Two minicomputers were selected for the pilot: The Télémécanique T1600 and the Mitra 15.Although the performance of the Mitra was three or four times better than the T1600, the delivery of the Mitra lagged by two months, so it was decided to install more T1600s than Mitras.

=== The Ariane rocket ===
In Kourou, at the Guiana Space Centre, the Ariane 1 control console was built around two Mitra 15s: one for managing electrical systems, the other for fluid systems. The Ariane 4 consoles also used two Mitra 15-30 computers and peripherals for command controls. One in the preparation area (CCD) Dock Command Control, the other in the launch area (CCE) Electrical Command Control. The peripherals have evolved during the launch campaigns and in particular the DRI magnetic head disks which have been replaced by RAM memory disks whose speed of access times has required software reorganizations.

On the launch pad, the Mitra 15, associated with an Intel Frontal Table Image (FTI), controlled, among other functions, the ignition sequence. A sustainability study of these computers and all the control consoles enabled them to be used until 2003, the date of the last Ariane 4 V159 flight.

== Political decisions in 1976 ==
CII was handicapped by its 1974-1976 merger with Honeywell-Bull, who were more centered on traditional business computing, and by the abandonment of Unidata, which caused the termination of orders from Siemens. Sales of the Mitra 15 were tied by CII with that of the big computer, the Iris 80, to the point that Le Monde asked if CII would not be forced to launch into this market and manufacture its own equipment. The Mitra 15 mini-computer, a mainstay since 1971 of its distributed computing strategy, was then sold to its shareholder Thomson, who had been opposed for more than a year to the merger of CII with Honeywell-Bull, despite a special mediation mission.

== Mitra 15 successors ==
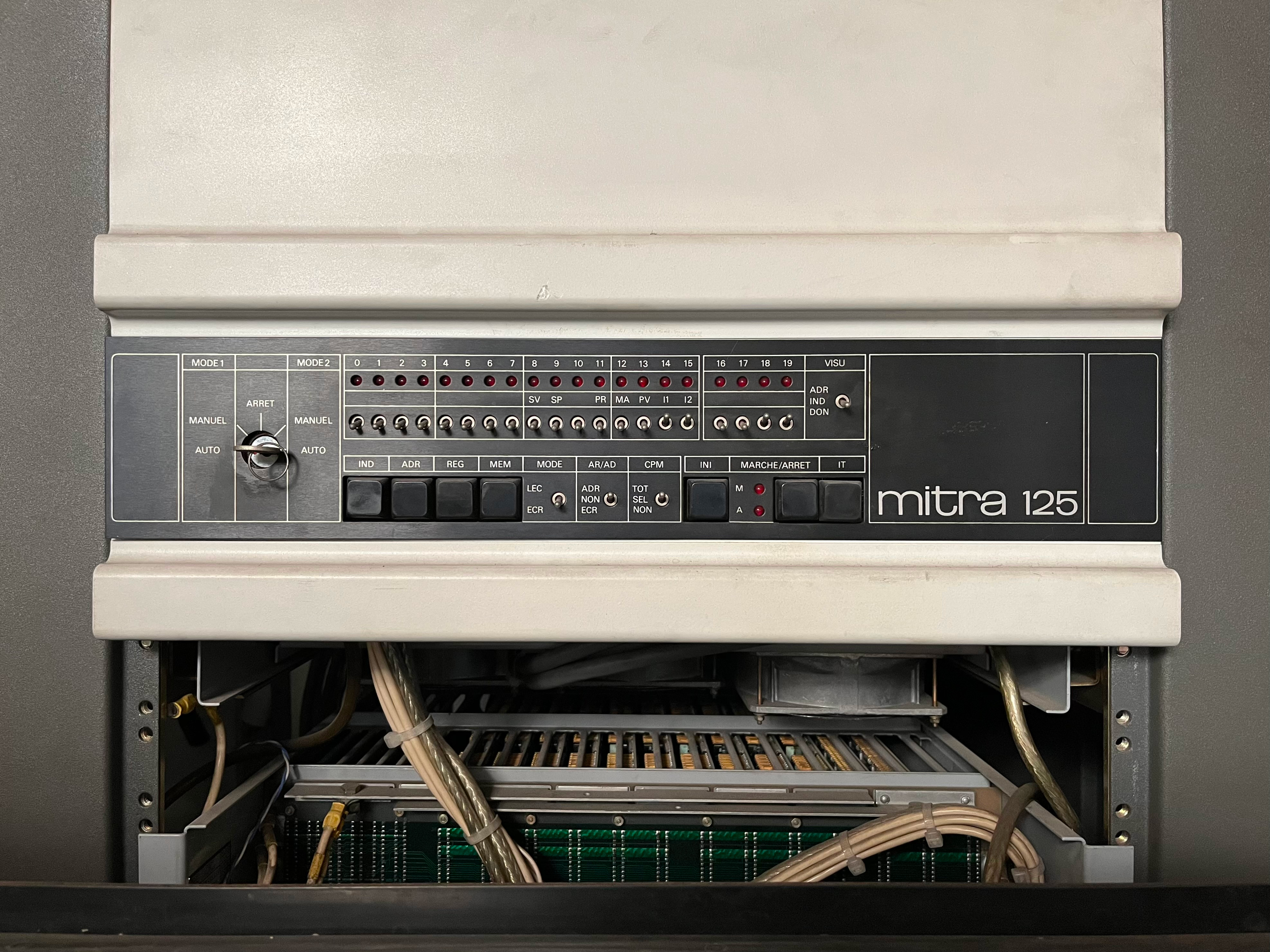
Front panel of a Mitra 125, first successor to the Mitra 15.

The Mitra 125, sometimes called "Mitra 15M/125" succeeded the Mitra 15 in 1975. It introduced a memory management unit, with extended addressing capabilities, protected memory and paging support, allowing it to address up to 32 pages of 64 kB for a total of 512 kB. It also added three I/O microcoded processors, and up to sixteen units could be interconnected for distributed computing. A version specially designed for the Spacelab, a modular space laboratory used during some of the missions of the American Space Shuttle, was also developed: the Mitra 125 MS.

Its immediate successor, the Mitra 225 was a powerful version built from 1975 around the AMD 2901 bit-slice microprocessors and MOS memory. This family of processors, easier to program than those of Intel, was also introduced in 1975 by Advanced Micro Devices.

From 1976, Mitra minicomputers were grouped, together in the European Society for Minicomputing and Systems, formed for civilian applications, with the mini-computers T1600 and Solar of Télémécanique (24%) and 9% of IDI.

The Mitra 525 ratifies, in a three-bus architecture, the possibilities of extension of the Mitra 225 with which it remains compatible. The 1982 Mitra 625 will only bring detail changes, allowing up to 25% more power. Finally, the 1984 Mitra 725 was produced at a time when SEMS was transferred to Bull, which "didn't deal much with this SEMS, having to deal with Honeywell's Level 6 as well as the heavy financial losses of the period, 1982-1984.

The Mitra 525, 625, and 725 used the ECL MC10800 and MC10802 circuits, introduced by Motorola in 1975, while Intel's 3002 lost its advantage over competitors.
