= Atego =

Atego may refer to:

- Atego (company) - former software company
- Mercedes-Benz Atego - truck
