= FITALY =

Keyboard layout for stylus or touch input

FITALY is a keyboard layout specifically optimized for stylus or touch-based input. The design places the most common letters closest to the centre to minimize distance travelled while entering a word. The name, FITALY, is derived from the letters occupying the second row in the layout (as QWERTY comes from the first row of standard keyboards).

In the first of several keyboards in the system, lowercase letters are arranged in the following pattern:

z	v	c	h	w	k
f	i	t	a	l	y
		n	e		
g	d	o	r	s	b
q	j	u	m	p	x

There are uppercase, numeric, and symbol keyboards as well, and various strokes (rather than taps) are used for both shifting case and selecting symbols. For details, see the manufacturer's site (below).

Fitaly was invented and patented by Jean Ichbiah and is commercialised by the company he founded, Textware Solutions.

The aim of the design is to optimise text entry by organising keys to minimise key-to-key finger movement, allowing faster input through one-finger entry (compared to ten digits required to type efficiently on QWERTY layout). As compared to the three-row QWERTY keyboard, FITALY has five rows with at most six letters in a row (as opposed to the ten on QWERTY).

Keys are arranged based on individual frequencies of letters in the English language, and the probability of transitions. The ten letters at the very centre (i, t, a, l, n, e, d, o, r, s) account for 73% of keystrokes in English; adding the four letters at top and bottom of the middle columns (c, h, u, m) brings this number to 84%. The user nearly always finds the next likely letter on a key very close to the one previously tapped.

Currently supported platforms are Pocket PC / Windows Mobile, and Windows Tablet PC. There was a version for the Palm. An Android version is under consideration, but Barry Shaffer had a DIY Android port. That port is impractical for inserting text anywhere but after the last character of a document.

== See also ==
- Personal digital assistant
- HexInput
