= Ichbiah =

Ichbiah is a surname. It is the 3,581,007th most common family name in the world, carried by around 1 in 251,280,501 persons. It is most common in Europe.

Notable people with the surname include:

- Jean Ichbiah (1940–2007), French computer scientist
