= Xerox 500 series =

Line of computers

The Xerox 500 series is a discontinued line of computers from Xerox Data Systems (XDS) introduced in the early 1970s as backward-compatible upgrades for the Sigma series machines.

Although orders for the Xerox 530 were deemed "encouraging" as of January 1974, the systems had failed to gain traction by the time Xerox sold its Data Systems Division in 1975. The buyer, Honeywell, Inc., continued to support existing 500-series systems until 1984 but discontinued manufacturing.

Binary integer arithmetic is standard on all models; floating-point is optional on the 530, and standard on the 550 and 560. The 560 also supports decimal arithmetic. The 550 and 560 include one or more "system control processors" (CPs) to handle interrupts, diagnostics, clocks, direct I/O, and operator communications. Systems are clusterable, with multiple "basic processors" (BPs), I/O processors (IOPs), and "system control processors" (CPs) sharing busses and memory.

== 16-bit systems (Xerox 530) ==
The Xerox 530 system is a 16-bit computer aimed at upgrading the 16-bit Sigma 2 and 3 systems. The 530 was the first system of the line introduced in early 1973.

The 530 supports memory sizes of 8 K to 64 K 16-bit words (16 KB to 128 KB) with a cycle time of 800 ns. The memory protection feature protects the foreground (real-time) program from the background tasks.

When IBM discontinued the 16-bit IBM 1130, Xerox began marketing the 530 as a possible successor, including mention of Fortan IV, COBOL and RPG. Both the 1130 and Xerox 530 had Indirect addressing and 8-bit relative addressing.

On the IBM 1130/1800 magnetic tape drives were only available as a special feature—RPQ (Request Price Quotation). The Xerox 530 offered a choice of 7-track drives operating at 37.5 inches per second (ips) or nine-track, 75 ips drives.

== 32-bit systems (Xerox 550, 560) ==
The Xerox 550 and Xerox 560 systems are 32-bit computers introduced in 1974. The 550 was aimed at real-time applications and intended as an upgrade for the Sigma 5. The 560 was aimed at the general-purpose Sigma 6, 7, and 9 upgrade market.

The systems are microprogrammed and constructed using large-scale and medium-scale integration (LSI and MSI) and magnetic-core memory. They feature independent Input/Output Processors (IOP), and "Direct Control" instructions for direct input/output of a single word via a parallel interface

The 550 and 560 support 16 K to 256 K 32-bit words (64 KB to 1 MB) . Main memory cycle time was 645 ns. Virtual memory and memory protection are standard features.

A 590 system was designed but never built.

== Operating systems ==
The 530 can run either the Basic Control Monitor (BCM) or the Real-time Batch Monitor (RBM) operating systems.

RBM supports a combination of real-time and general-purpose batch jobs running at the same time. An example of this could be RJE to a larger machine while running local computing.

The 550 runs the Control Program for Real-Time (CP-R) operating system, or the CP-V operating system.

Much as IBM's Job Control Language statements begin with // (Slash-Slash), Xerox uses an exclamation point (!), which it called "Bang."
