= Alsys =

Software company

Alsys, SA. (founded 1980, merged 1995) was a software development company created to support initial work on the Ada programming language. In July 1995, Alsys merged to become Thomson Software Products (TSP), which merged into Aonix in 1996.

== History ==
Alsys SA. the French company was founded in 1980 by Jean Ichbiah (1940–2007) as executive director. Also in 1980 the American subsidiary Alsys Inc was formed with Ben Brosgol (from Intermetrics), and Pascal Clève.

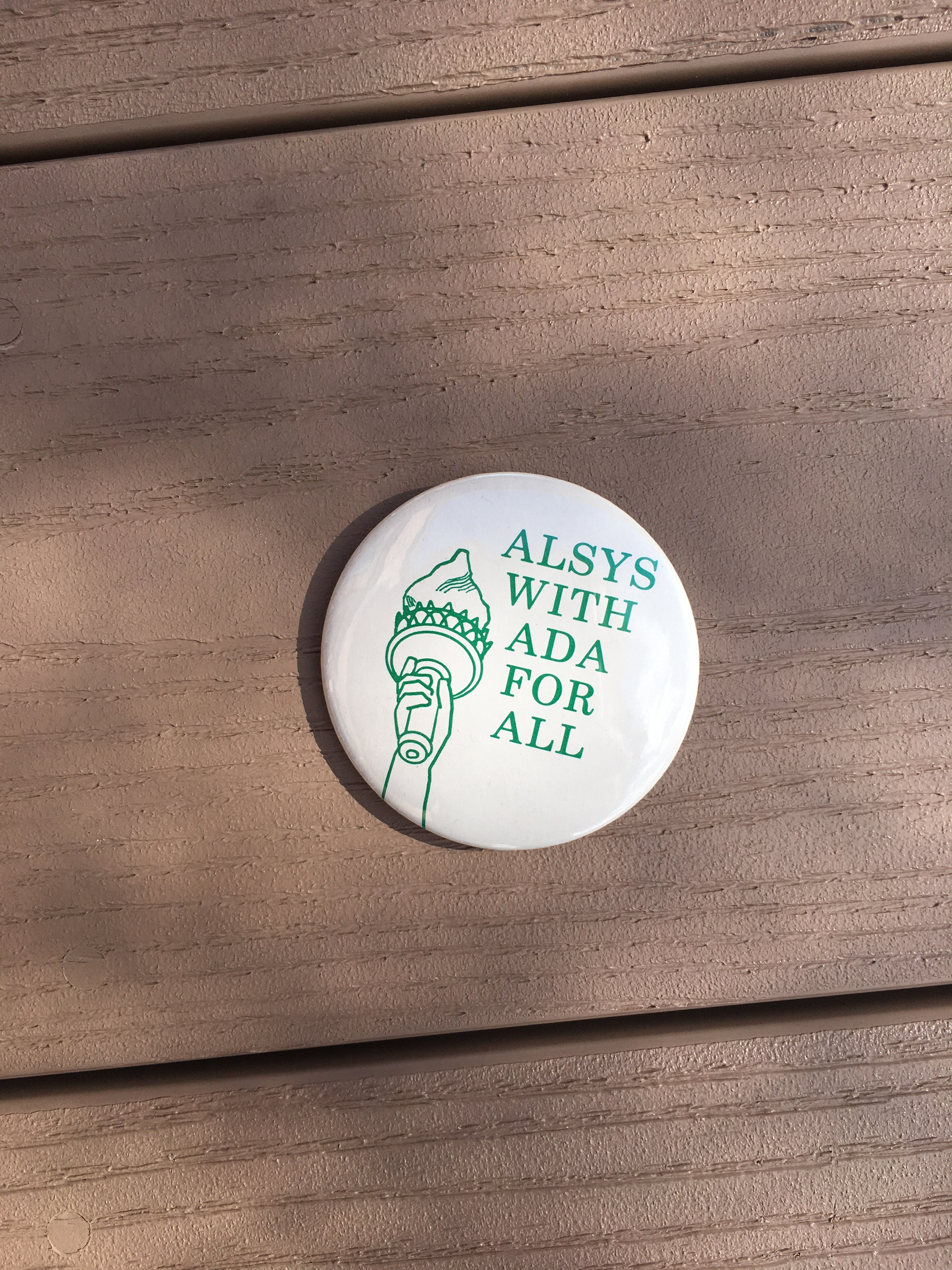
Promotional pin button, mid-late 1980s

In 1985 a British subsidiary, Alsys Ltd was formed with John Barnes as the MD.

During the merger mania of the 1990s, Alsys was repositioned via a series of mergers.

In 1991 Alsys was acquired by Thomson-CSF.

In November 1992, Thomson-CSF acquired TeleSoft and merged it with Alsys.

In July 1995, Thomson-CSF merged two of their subsidiaries, Alsys and MUST Software, a software development corporation based in Norwalk, Connecticut, to form Thomson Software Products (TSP).

In November 1996, TSP merged with IDE (Interactive Development Environments, Inc.) to form Aonix.

Thomson-CSF (now known as Thales), sold Aonix to Gore Technology Group (GTG) in the late 1990s.

Aonix acquired Select Software in 2001.

In January 2003, GTG sold the Critical Development Solutions (CDS) division of Aonix, which included the Alsys, Telesoft and IDE product lines, to a group of French investors. The name Aonix was kept for this new company, while Select Business Solutions was the name given to the part under Gore control.

In 2003, Aonix acquired NewMonics of Tucson, Arizona, a supplier of Java-compliant virtual machines for embedded and real-time systems.

In January, 2010 Aonix merged with Artisan Software Tools to form Atego.

Alsys was one of the few companies that developed products that unleashed the protected mode of the 80286 processor. At the time, most applications were limited to using only 640K of memory. With the Ada compiler, applications could be built using up to 16MB of memory.
