= Credo Reference =

American company

Credo
- Type: Subsidiary
- Industry: Reference/database and educational services
- Headquarters: 50 Milk Street, 16th Floor, Boston, Massachusetts, United States
- Key people: Chief Executive Officer: Mike Sweet
- Products: Credo General Reference (Academic, Public, School); Essential Subject Collections; Credo Add-on perpetual eBooks; InfoLit Modules; Credo Instruct; Credo View
- Parent: Infobase Publishing
- Website: corp.credoreference.com

Credo Reference or Credo (formerly Xrefer) is an American company that offers online reference content by subscription and partners with libraries to develop information-literacy programs or produce library marketing plans and materials. Founded in 1999, Credo Reference provides full-text online versions of over 3,500 published reference works from more than 100 publishers in a variety of major subjects. These include general and subject dictionaries as well as encyclopedias. The company's customers are libraries, library systems, k-12 schools, and universities, which subscribe to the service for their patrons' use.

In 2010, a review of general reference sources by Library Journal focused on Credo Reference and three similar services. The review noted Credo Reference's internal linking within the site from one reference work to another.

== History ==
The company was founded as Xrefer in 1999. Xrefer initially provided free access to several dozen reference works. In 2002, Béla Hatvany, founder of Computer Library Services (CLSI) and Silverplatter, invested in Xrefer and funded the company's transition to becoming an online reference database product for libraries. The company established an office in Boston, MA USA, which would later become its headquarters. The name Credo Reference was adopted in June 2007; the company also moved its England office from London to Oxford in that year.

In 2018, Credo Reference was acquired by Infobase Publishing.
