= Béla Hatvany =

American library pioneer

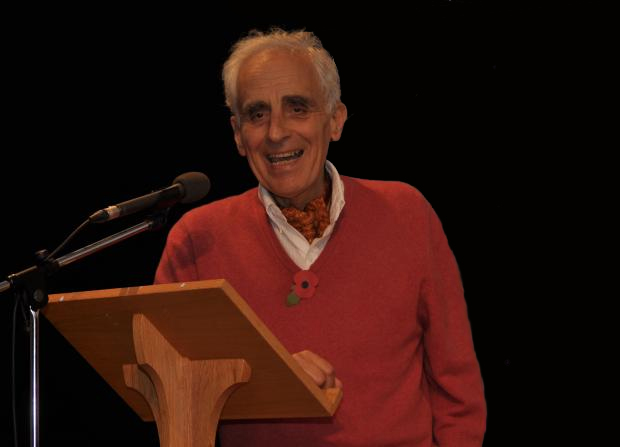
Béla Hatvany

Béla Hatvany is a pioneer in the automation of libraries and the information industry. Companies founded by him have been responsible for the first Online Public Access Catalog (OPAC), the first CD-ROMs, the first networked CD-ROM, the first client-server library databases, and some of the earliest internet library database retrieval engines. In addition, he was a key investor in the first streaming music databases for libraries (Classical.com), and online ready references for libraries (Credo Reference). He is recognized as a visionary in library information.

== Biography ==
Béla Hatvany was born in 1938 in London a few weeks after his parents arrived as immigrants. His father was a Hungarian Jew and a Baron, his mother from Spanish nobility. Béla spent his childhood in England. He received a scholarship to attend University of St Andrews from BP. In 1956 he began his career as a customer service engineer, a computer programmer and a salesman.

In 1965, he moved to the United States to get an MBA at Harvard University. He founded his first company, COMSISA, in Mexico City, in 1968 which computerised and served sugar mills and local businesses.

In 1971, in partnership with Dennis Beaumont, Computer Library Services (CLSI) was started in Boston. This was the first company to develop the minicomputer for use in libraries, in effect building the Online Public Access Computer (OPAC) market. After returning to live in London in 1981, Hatvany sold it to Thyssen Bornemisza in 1983.

In 1982, he started a small organization called "INCubator" based in Chiswick, West London. This later became SilverPlatter Information. The company published the first CD-ROMs in 1982 and thrived, developing a number of innovative products including networked CD-ROM, client-server delivery for bibliographic databases. Silver Platter Information was one of the first companies to deliver databases on the internet. In 2001 it was sold to Wolters-Kluwer.

From 2001 to 2017 Béla was active as an angel investor in early-stage UK and US companies that focus on strong positive social contributions such as JustGiving, Credo Reference, MediaSilo, Classical.com, Harmonix, LuvliFoods and CoreWeb.

In 2001 Hatvany became the key investor and a board member of JustGiving in London where he mentored the founders Zarine Kharas and Anne Marie Huby. They worked together to create an organisation in which all constituents experience themselves to be well-served. JustGiving pioneered on-line giving and became the world's leading online fundraising platform enabling individuals to raise over £2Bn for charities. It was sold to Blackbaud Inc in October 2017.

Hatvany served on the board of a number of other companies which he encouraged to embrace the philosophy of serving all their constituents in a balanced way. His extensive business experience helped the companies refine their vision to emphasize the importance of (right) corporate culture and focus on excellent user experience.

Mustardseed Trust is a UK-registered charity founded in 2001 by Béla Hatvany, Ellen Hatvany and Lauren Hatvany. Mustardseed enables organizations and individuals with a clear and compelling vision to create systems based on partnership that care for the web of life. Mustardseed's three focus areas are: 1.Culture Shift from domination to partnership 2.The CAREconomy: economic models that value care and promote the principles of partnership 3.Ecosystem preservation and restoration through partnership with the earth's systems.

From 2009 to 2012 Mustardseed initiated AkiliMali to help entrepreneurs in East Africa. This emphasized the creation of local business advisors to mentor fledgeling businesses.

In 2013 Béla commissioned a short film called 'Change' through producer Kelly Burks and Initiatives of Change, UK. The core message of the film was the importance of shifting the focus of business from short term profit to long-term sustainable profitability. Narrated by Jeremy Irons, the film was a 'fire starter' and premiered at the TIGE Conference (Trust and Integrity in the Global Economy) in Caux, Switzerland in July, 2013.

Later in 2013, the film became the calling card for ‘The Béla Initiative’ which Hatvany announced as an alliance in which organizations, individuals, businesses and entrepreneurs could join to collaborate, share information and experience. The Béla Initiative's purpose is to give and to receive in ways that empower oneself or others to develop a clear purpose to serve the whole – in short, to enable a world that works for everyone.

In December 2013 Hatvany collaborated with Lawrence Bloom, Chairman of Be Energy, Kelly Burks and Initiatives of Change, UK to launch the first meeting of 'The Change Enquiry' which was the natural progression from 'The Béla Initiative'. The enquiry focused on how to shift from combative, competitive, dominating, patriarchal culture to a culture of harmonization, collaboration, and listening for what connects us. The conference was held at Initiatives of Change HQ in London.

The initial conference was followed by two further conferences in 2014 at Initiatives of Change with the attendees self-forming into a number of teams: Communication, Enterprise, Technology, Collaboration, Consciousness, Governance and Team Building while self-distilling down to the key advocates for the enquiry.

The teams examined the necessity of a shift in worldview, values and awareness at a personal and collective level:

- Engage everyone in an enquiry that enables a world which works for all beings in a balanced way.
- Centre the enquiry on how we can change our behaviour from combative/competitive to collaborative/harmonizing
- Humanity should emulate nature – in a healthy ecology all things thrive – not one or two with the remainder diminishing.
- Create a new economy which eradicates the fear that surrounds money.
- Replace TV and newspapers with modern IT and media systems that invite our involvement and enable us to influence the systems which govern us.
- Trustbuilding is the most effective and least expensive form of security today.

CE members from the collaboration team met in Epping Forest to spend the day in honest conversation looking at the value of collaboration on a personal level and created a short film, Collaboration Day.

Discussions in the enquiry ranged over the use of the web and the communications team developed a concept to create a ‘Share Yourself’ app where people worldwide could see a wall of faces of people from around the globe and click on any of them to hear them answer 3 questions; I am, I fear, I love - and be able to record their own responses to these questions. Communications team members attended the TIGE Conference see page 23 in Caux, Switzerland in July 2014 to film volunteers providing an unexpectedly powerful insight into the lives of people around the world.

From 2014 to 2017 Béla took the learning gained from the Change Enquiry and expanded his vision for enabling a world that works for everyone through the development of his concept for The Care Economy. He met and liaised with a number of leading individuals calling for an economic revolution including Bernard Lietaer, Kate Raworth, Riane Eisler, Enno_Schmidt Enno Schmidt], Stefanie Ristig-Bresser, Christian Felber, Guy Standing and others.

Hatvany was invited to the TIGE Conference at Caux in 2014 where he spoke and shared his 'Sketch for a new economy which works for everyone.'

Béla convened 'Economy for the Common Good - The Care Economy Enquiry' at Caux in July 2016 alongside the TIGE Conference. Béla, Stefanie Ristig-Bresser, a pioneer from the Economy for the Common Good, UBI filmmaker, Enno Schmidt, and others guided this enquiry.

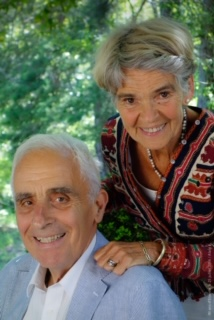
Béla and Ellen Hatvany

In 2016 Hatvany met Stefanie Overbeck, creator of the Polymoney Game. This meeting was instigated by Bernard Lietaer, who had used Polymoney in his teaching syllabus since 2012. Stefanie meeting Béla resulted in a collaboration between Mustardseed and Polymoney; the Polymoney Summit Caux in July 2017. Fifteen activists and practitioners in complementary and alternative currencies from different parts of the world shared their experiences and started to work together. They requested a follow-on conference. Hatvany named the broader vision to enable an economy which cares for humanity and our planet - theCAREconomy.

Béla and Lauren Hatvany, through the Mustardseed Trust, sponsored Overbeck and the team she formed to realise the first theCAREconomy Meet-up (1st) at Caux, Switzerland in June, 2018. The meet-up provided ample time for an international gathering of 70 activists and practitioners to meet one another and work with economic experts, in person. theCAREconomy meet-up lives on as a digital knowledge platform. The 1st TCE meet-up is intended to be replicated and delivered in cities and communities worldwide. Hatvany stated, ‘The relentless growth economy is destroying the earth and our culture. A shift to a care economy will enable humanity to look after the earth and all beings on it.’ The next meet-up will be organised by one of the participating community clusters in 2020.

In 2018 Béla started a collaboration with Wim Kiezenberg. Together they launched everyday.earth An ecosystem of people working on solutions. This French association, based in Nice, identifies what we need to transform our current growth driven local economies into one earth-wide caring economy. Hatvany is president and published his open letter to the world in September 2018.

Béla has been married since 1964 to Ellen and has six children and eleven grandchildren, a dog and a cat. Ellen and Béla meditate together daily for the last 46 years and consult one another on all matters.

== Awards ==
- In 1987, Hatvany received the LITA/Gaylord Award for Achievement in Library and Information Technology.
- In 1991, he received the Entrepreneurial Excellence Award from the Optical Publishing Association.
- In 2000, the National Federation of Advanced Information Services NFAIS honoured him with the Miles Conrad Award
