= SilverPlatter =

Publishing companies of the United States

SilverPlatter Information, Inc.
- Industry: electronic publishing, information, library service vendor
- Founded: 1983
- Founder: Bela Hatvany; Walt Winshall
- Area served: Sales to more than 150 countries
- Parent: Wolters Kluwer

SilverPlatter Information, Inc. was one of the first companies to produce commercial reference databases on CD-ROMs. It was founded in 1983 in the United Kingdom by Béla Hatvany and Walt Winshall with the explicit intention of using CD technology to publish data, and thus provide an alternative to searching databases in magnetic tape format. Ron Rietdyk was the company's first President. The firm was started in 1986 from a small building in Newton Lower Falls, Massachusetts.

The company began experimenting with four databases: ERIC, LISA, PsycLIT, and EMBASE. In 1987 the company had 12 databases and revenues of approximately $6m. Competing with CD Plus (now Ovid Technologies), Aries, Cambridge Scientific Abstracts and Dialog, the company offered libraries a wide range of CD-ROMs. Over the next few years the company expanded from its academic base into medical, business and health and safety CD publishing.

In 1989 the firm launched MultiPlatter, a system for networking CD-ROMs across local area networks. In 1991, it introduced searching the data held at the company's site by ERL (the electronic reference library), a system for providing hard disk access to its databases via the DXP protocol. This last proved successful with more than 500 sites using the firm's technology by 1997. In that year the company had grown to $75m in revenues and had over 250 databases.

In 2001, SilverPlatter was sold to Wolters Kluwer at a reputed price of $113m, and now forms part of Ovid Technologies, the Wolters Kluwer subsidiary.
