= Atego (company) =

Software company in United Kingdom

- Logo before being acquired by PTC
- Industry: Software
- Founded: 1996
- Founder: Jean Ichbiah
- Successor: PTC, Inc.
- Headquarters: San Diego, California, United States
- Website: atego.com

Atego was a software development corporation headquartered in the United States and the United Kingdom with subsidiaries in France, Germany, and Italy. Formed from Interactive Development Environments, Inc. and Thomson Software Products, it was called Aonix from 1996 until 2010. It was acquired by PTC in 2014.

== History ==
The company might be considered an example of the "merger mania" of the 1990s and beyond. Aonix was formed in November 1996 by merging two software development tools companies: Interactive Development Environments, a modelling, analysis and design tools developer, and Thomson Software Products (TSP). TSP was based in Norwalk, Connecticut with engineering and support facilities in Norwalk and San Diego, California.

TSP was established in July 1995, as a United States subsidiary of the French firm Thomson-CSF, formed by merging the Thomson subsidiary Alsys of San Diego with Must Software International of Norwalk. The staff in Norwalk continued to provide client/server fourth-generation language (4GL) and middleware products, while the ex-Alsys worked on high-performance Ada programming language development environments and the TeleUSE family of graphical user interface development tools.

== Acquisition ==
In December, 1998, Aonix was acquired by private equity firm The Gores Group (then known as Gores Technology Group). Aonix owned the product lines Nomad software, Ultraquest and Select Solution Factory until two groups split in January 2003 in a management buy-out. The new company, based in Boulder, Colorado and still owned by Gores, was named Select Business Solutions. Aonix merged with real-time and embedded Java tools vendor NewMonics, of Tucson, Arizona in 2003, acquiring the PERC product line.

In January 2010, Aonix and Artisan Software Tools (based in Cheltenham, UK) agreed to merge, forming a new company called Atego. The combined company was headquartered in San Diego. In March 2010 Atego acquired BlueRiver Software, the Germany-based maker of the X32 C/C++ interactive development environment. In 2011 it acquired the ApexAda family of Ada compilers from the Rational Software division of IBM.

PTC, Inc. announced on July 1, 2014, it acquired Atego, for approximately $50 million in cash.

== Products ==
Product lines included AdaWorld, Ameos, Architecture Component Development, ObjectAda (now PTC ObjectAda), PERC (now PTC Perc), RAVEN, SmartKernel, Software Through Pictures, and TeleUSE (now PTC TeleUSE).
