= XDOS =

XDOS may refer to:

- Cromemco XDOS, a diagnostic and bootstrap program for the Cromemco XXU.
- Pat Villani's XDOS, an early predecessor to NSS-DOS, DOS/NT, DOS-C and the FreeDOS kernel
- XML denial-of-service attack

== See also ==
- DOS (disambiguation)
- XOS (disambiguation)
