= Universal Time-Sharing System =

Universal Timesharing System (UTS)
- Developer: Xerox Data Systems
- Written in: Assembly Language (Meta-Symbol)
- OS family: Not Applicable
- Working state: Discontinued
- Source model: Unknown
- Initial release: 1966; 60 years ago
- Latest release: D00 / Q1, 1973
- Supported platforms: Xerox Data Systems Sigma 6, Sigma 7, Sigma 9
- Default user interface: Command-line interface
- License: Unknown

The Universal Time-Sharing System (UTS) was an operating system for the Scientific Data Systems Sigma series of computers, succeeding Batch Processing Monitor (BPM)/Batch Time-Sharing Monitor (BTM). UTS was announced in 1966, but because of delays did not actually ship until 1971. It was designed to provide multi-programming services for online (interactive) user programs in addition to batch-mode production jobs, symbiont (spooled) I/O, and critical real-time processes. System daemons, called "ghost jobs" were used to run monitor code in user space. The final release, D00, shipped in January, 1973. It was succeeded by the CP-V operating system, which combined UTS with features of the heavily batch-oriented Xerox Operating System (XOS).

== Variants ==
The CP-V (pronounced sea-pea-five) operating system, the compatible successor to UTS, was released in August 1973. CP-V supported the same CPUs as UTS plus the Xerox 560. CP-V offers "single-stream and multiprogrammed batch; timesharing; and the remote processing mode, including intelligent remote batch." Realtime processing was added in release B00 in April 1974, and transaction processing in release C00 in November 1974.

CP-V version C00 and F00, and Telefile's TCP-V version I00 still run on a Sigma emulator developed in 1997.

=== CP-R ===
CP-R (Control Program for Real-Time) is a discontinued Real-time operating system for Xerox 550 and Sigma 9 computer systems. CP-R supports three types of tasks: Foreground Primary Tasks, Foreground Secondary Tasks, and Batch Tasks.

=== CP-6 ===
CP-6 is a CP-V work-alike, built from scratch, which runs on Honeywell computers.

In 1975, Xerox decided to exit the computer business which it had purchased from Scientific Data Systems in 1969. Honeywell offered to purchase Xerox Data Systems, initially to provide field service support to the existing customer base.

The CP-6 system including OS and program products was developed, beginning in 1976, by Honeywell to convert Xerox CP-V users to run on Honeywell equipment. The first beta site was installed at Carleton University in Ottawa Canada in June 1979, and three other sites were installed before the end of 1979.

Support for CP-6 was transferred to ACTC in Canada in 1993. CP-6 systems continued to run for many years in the US, Canada, Sweden, the UK, and Germany. The final system shut down was at Carleton University in 2005.

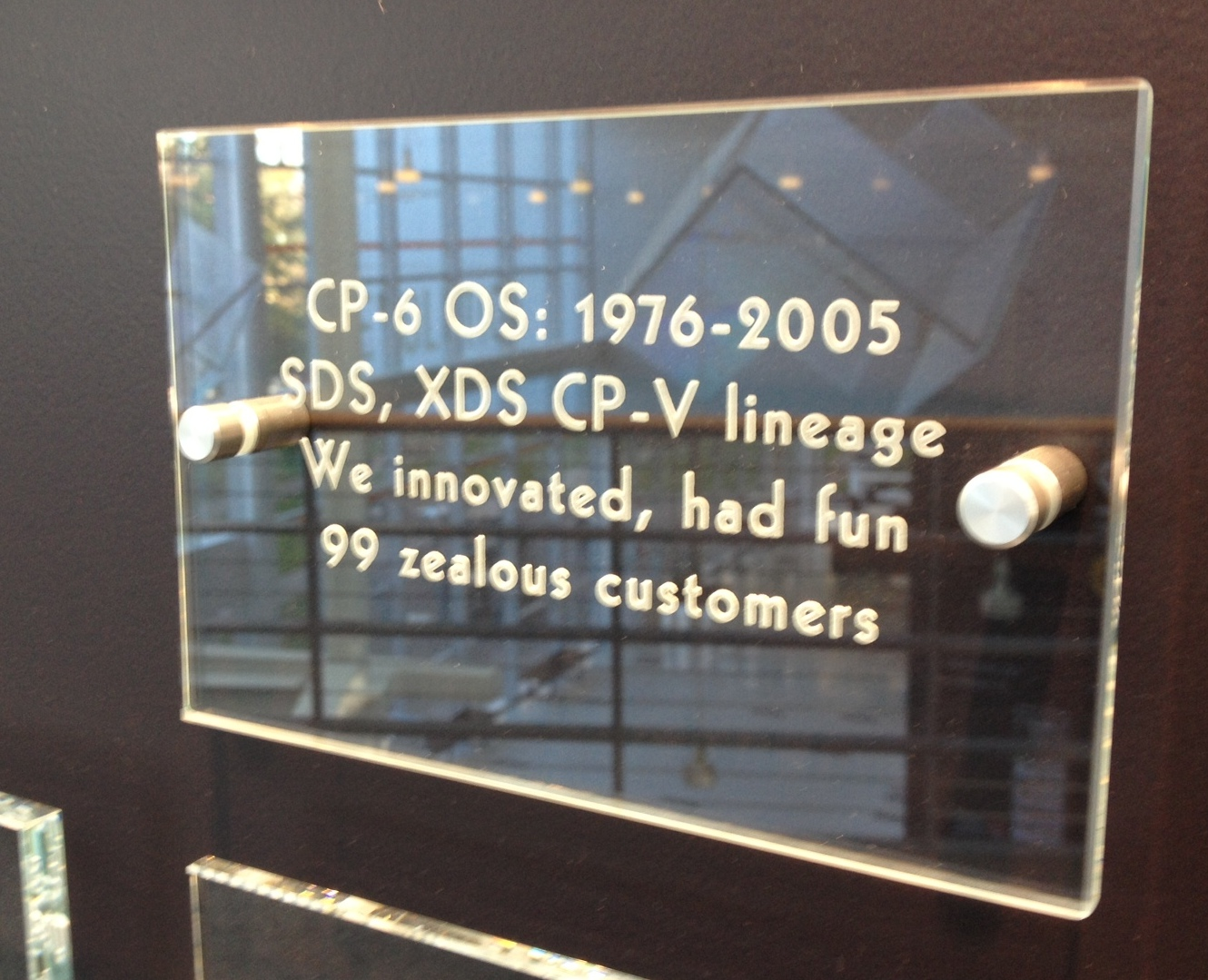
CP-6 Community wall Plaque at CHM

CP-6 and its accomplishments, its developers, and its customers are commemorated with a plaque on the community wall at the Computer History Museum in Mountain View, California.

== Software ==
CP-V Software as of release B00, 1974. CP-V was supported by the CP-6 team at the Honeywell Los Angeles Development Center (LADC) until 1977 and thereafter.

=== Bundled Software ===
- TEL – Terminal Executive Language.
- EASY – Simple interactive environment for FORTRAN and BASIC programs and data files.
- CCI – Control Command (or Card) Interpreter. The batch counterpart of TEL.
- BATCH – Submit jobstream to batch queue.
- PCL – Peripheral Conversion Language (pronounced "pickle"). Data file device to device copy.
- EDIT – Line Editor.
- LINK – One-pass linking loader.
- LOAD – Two-pass overlay loader.
- DELTA – Instruction-level debugger.
- SORT/MERGE.
- Extended FORTRAN IV.
- FDP – FORTRAN Debug Package.
- META-SYMBOL – Macro assembler.
- BASIC.
- FLAG – Load-and-go FORTRAN compatible with IBM Fortran-H.
- ANS COBOL.
- COBOL On-Line debugger.
- APL.
- SL-1 – Simulation Language.
- IBM 1400 Series Simulator.
- SYSGEN – System Generation.
- DEFCOM – Export external definitions from a load module.
- SYMCON – Manipulate symbols in a load module.
- ANALYZE – System dump analyzer.

=== Separately Priced Software ===
- MANAGE – A generalized file management and reporting tool.
- EDMS – Database Management System.
- GPDS – General Purpose Discrete Simulator.
- CIRC – Electronic Circuit Analysis.

=== Contributed Software ===
Xerox maintained a library of other Xerox and user-written software from the EXCHANGE user group.

== Current status ==
The SIMH emulator has support for Sigma hardware. Honeywell released the system as open source. CP-V F00 is available on GitHub under an MIT License.
