= Jean Ichbiah =

French computer scientist (1940–2007)

Jean David Ichbiah (Software Engineer) Chief executive officer Alsys (1980-1991)
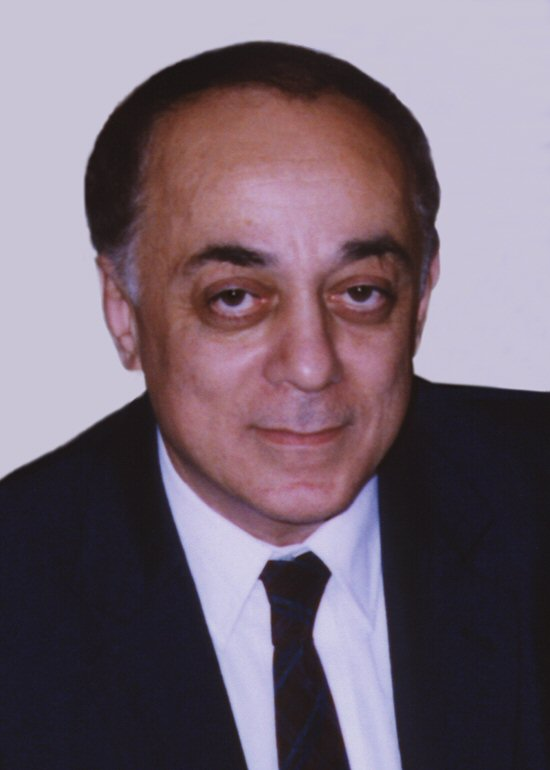
- Jean Ichbiah 1989-90, picture for ALSYS
- Born: 25 March 1940
- Died: 26 January 2007 (aged 66)
- Education: Massachusetts Institute of Technology Doctor of Philosophy in Operations research from in 1964 École polytechnique Diplôme d'Ingénieur
- Occupations: Software engineering Operations research Chief executive officer Alsys & Thomson Software Products (1980-1991)
- Employer: Alsys Thomson Software Products Plan Calcul International Federation for Information Processing
- Known for: chief designer (1977–1983) of the Ada programming language Invention FITALY in ( 1990)

Jean David Ichbiah (25 March 1940 – 26 January 2007) was a French and American computer scientist. From 1977 to 1983, he was the chief designer of Ada, a general-purpose, strongly typed programming language with certified validated compilers.

== Early life ==
Ichbiah was a descendant of Greek and Turkish Jews from Thessaloniki who emigrated to France.

== Career ==
In 1980, Ichbiah founded the software development company Alsys, created to support initial work on the Ada programming language. In July 1995, Alsys merged to become Thomson Software Products (TSP), which itself would subsequently merge into Aonix in 1996. From 1972 to 1974, Ichbiah worked on designing an experimental system implementation language called LIS, based on Pascal and Simula. He had been chairman of the Simula User's Group and was one of the founding members of IFIP WG 2.4 on Systems Implementation Languages.

Ichbiah then joined CII Honeywell Bull (CII-HB) in Louveciennes, France, becoming a member of the Programming Research division. Among other projects, he worked on the rewrite of the Siris 7 operating system into Siris 8 ,Mainframe computer CII Iris 80 developed by the French company CII.

Ichbiah's team submitted a language design labelled "Green" to a competition to choose the United States Department of Defense's embedded programming language. When Green was selected in 1978, he continued as chief designer of the language, now named "Ada". In 1980, Ichbiah left CII-HB and founded the Alsys corporation in La Celle-Saint-Cloud, which continued language definition to standardize Ada 83, and later went into the Ada compiler business, also supplying special validated compiler systems to NASA, the US Army, and others. He later moved to the Waltham, Massachusetts subsidiary of Alsys.

In the 1990s, Ichbiah designed the keyboard layout FITALY, which is specifically optimized for stylus or touch-based input. Subsequently, he started the Textware Solutions company, which sells text entry software for PDAs and tablet PCs, as well as text-entry software for medical transcription on PCs.

== Member ==
French Academy of Sciences(1979)

== Awards and honors ==
In 1979, Jean Ichbiah was designated a chevalier (knight) of the French Legion of Honour and a correspondent of the French Academy of Sciences. He received a Certificate of Distinguished Service from the United States Department of Defense for his work on Ada.

== Death ==
Jean Ichbiah died from complications of a brain tumor on January 26, 2007.
