= CII Iris 80 =

Computer made by the French company CII

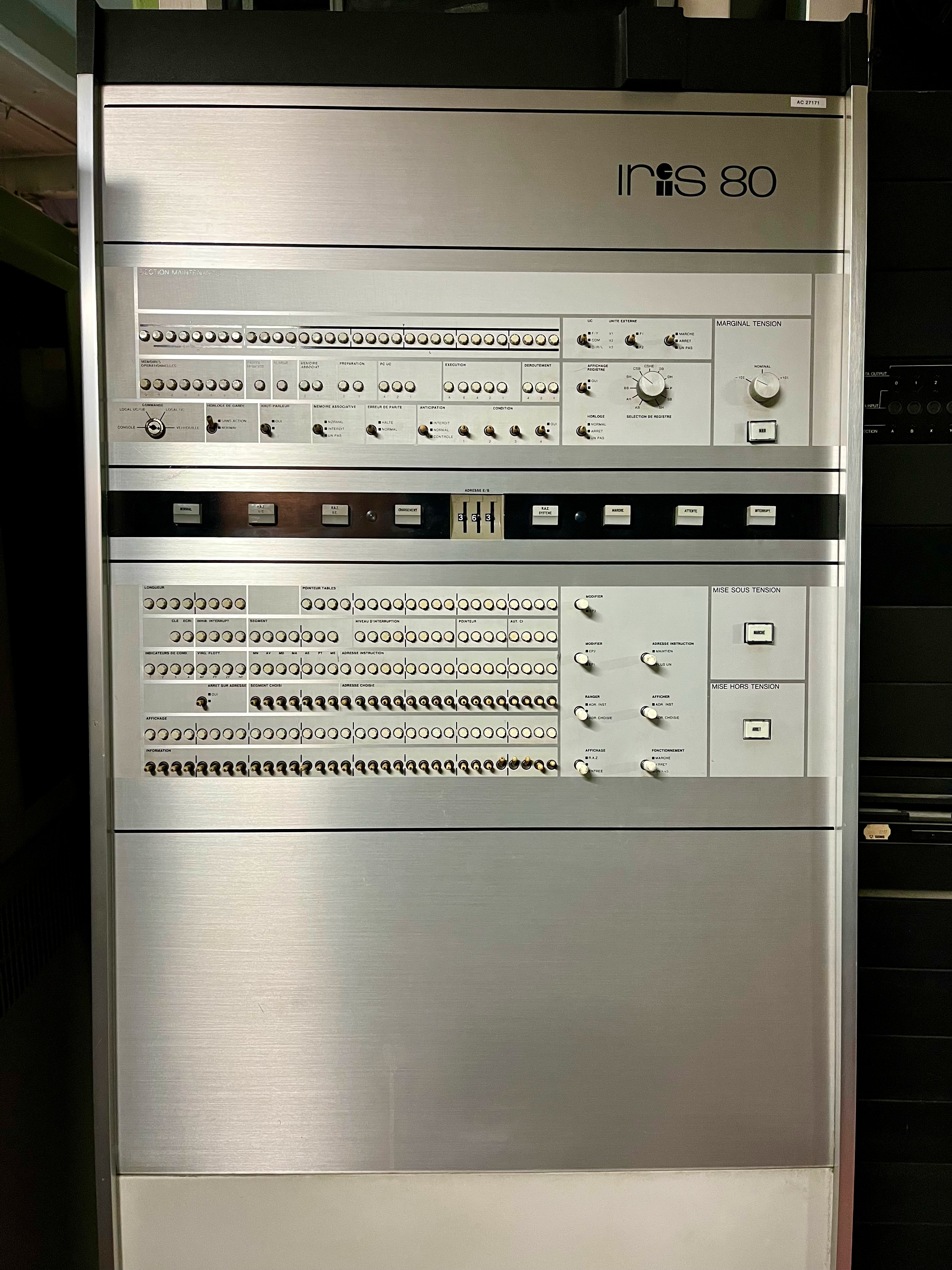
- Front panel of an IRIS 80 from the ACONIT computer museum, Grenoble
- Manufacturer: CII
- Type: Mainframe computer
- Released: 1971 (announced in 1969)
- Discontinued: 1976
- Units sold: About a hundred
- Operating system: Siris 8
- CPU: Integrated (3rd generation), 32 bits, available in single and multiple configurations @ 650ns cycle (~1.5 MHz)
- Memory: 4 MB
- Storage: Hard drives (25 to 200 MB)
- Predecessor: CII Iris 50
- Successor: CII-HB DPS-7

The CII Iris 80 computer is the most powerful computer made by the French company CII as part of Plan Calcul. It was released in 1970 and had roughly the same capabilities and performance as its main rivals in Europe: the IBM 360/75 and 360/85.

The Iris 80 is the backward-compatible successor to the CII 10070, a licensed SDS Sigma-7, and to the Iris 50, an in-house development from the Sigma-9 architecture. It essentially upgraded the Iris 50 with modern integrated circuits, as well as multiprocessor capabilities. Its operating system, Siris 8, was also upgraded from Siris 7 to leverage the new capabilities of the Iris 80.

Because of a policy of national preference that the Plan Calcul imposed on the public sector, this computer was installed at four of the approximately twenty French university computing centers in the mid-1970s, as well as INRIA and other research organizations.

About a hundred Iris 80s were delivered, including 27 dual-processors.

The CS 40, used for telephone switching, was derived from it.

The original successors to the Iris 80 were supposed to be the CII / Unidata X4 and X5 set to be released in 1976. However, after the eventual merger of CII with Honeywell-Bull, the Iris 80 was instead succeeded by the DPS-7, which included an Iris 80 and Siris 8 emulation mode to ensure compatibility.

== Hardware ==
=== CPU ===
The CPU is a modification of the CII 10070 (32-bit words, largely identical instruction set), with addressing revised for multi-processor operation. Paging uses associative memory. Main memory can be expanded to 4 megabytes. Calculation precision is 64 bits, ensuring the convergence of calculations that may diverge on other machines.

=== Peripherals ===
Magnetic disk capacity increased from the MD 25 (25 megabytes) to MD 200 (200 megabytes) by 1974. Mitra 15 minicomputers are used as controllers.

== Software ==
=== Operating systems ===
The Iris 80's operating system is a multitasking operating system known as Siris 8, a rewrite of Siris 7, intended to take advantage of new addressing modes. This rewrite was carried out by Jean Ichbiah, and notably made it possible to operate an Iris 80 triple-processor system in Évry.

Siris 8 handles a varied workload, including batch processing (local and remote processing) and time sharing. It was the first system to include routing software for the transport of data to other computers, Transiris, and a networking and data sharing system, adapted to the customers at universities, research centers, and administrations of Iris 80. The CYCLADES network was notably demonstrated at SICOB 1975 with applications simultaneously running at the INRIA headquarters at Rocquencourt and various regional sites.

=== Languages ===
- Symbol assembler,
- Metasymbol, a meta-assembler
- LP70, a language similar to PL360
- COBOL
- Fortran IV extended
- BASIC
- Algol 60
- PL/I
- Pascal
- Simula 67
- SNOBOL
- Lisp—Several implementations of Lisp, from the universities of Toulouse, Grenoble, etc., were used by the university community
- LIS, a systems implementation language, derived from MESA, Modula-2 and Simula, intended for writing portable operating systems

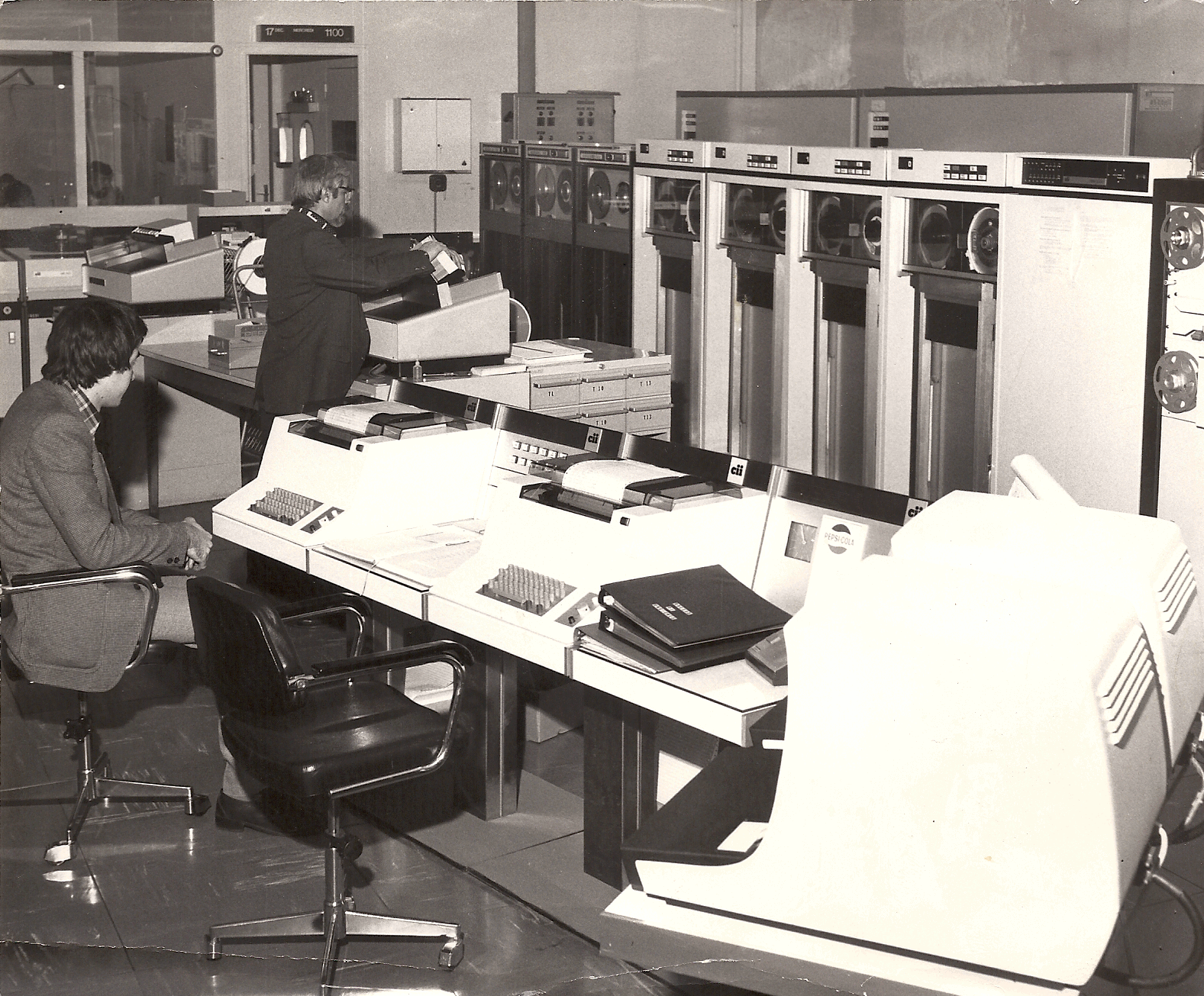
Iris 80 at Institut universitaire de calcul automatique de Lorraine(IUCAL) in Nancy, 1977

=== Software packages ===
- Mistral document retrieval system
- Socrate database management system
- Modulef modular library for calculation using the finite element method
