= IBM STAIRS =

The IBM Storage and Information Retrieval System, better known by the acronym STAIRS, was a program providing storage and online free-text search of text data. STAIRS ran under the OS/360 operating system under the CICS or IMS transaction monitors, and supported IBM 3270 display terminals.

== History ==
STAIRS was introduced as a product in 1973, but had previously been developed in-house by IBM in support of its antitrust lawsuit in 1969. Originally the product was called simply STAIRS but, with the advent of IBM's "/Virtual Storage" operating systems (such as OS/VS1), the non-CMS versions were later renamed to STAIRS/VS.

STAIRS was initially released as an application running under IMS and CICS, but a VM/CMS implementation was developed by IBM Canada in the late 1970s and marketed mostly in Europe, called STAIRS/CMS.

STAIRS was succeeded by IBM SearchManager/370 and SearchManager/2 in 1991, and was discontinued in 1992, with support ceasing in 1994.

== Description ==
STAIRS queries were formulated as boolean expressions of desired terms. In addition to the normal boolean functions of AND, OR, and NOT, STAIRS recognized such modifiers as adjacent to or in the same paragraph as. Plain text documents could also contain so-called formatted fields, which could be used for additional selection. These might contain fixed information such as a date or state name.

A powerful feature was that queries could be saved and re-executed. Queries could also be extended; for example, by specifying the result of previous query five AND an additional search term.

When search results were displayed for the user, 3270 highlighting was used to emphasize occurrences of search terms.

== Uses ==
STAIRS was used in-house by organizations such as large corporations and government agencies with large collections of unstructured documents. It was also bundled by database providers as a subscription service.

== Technical details ==
STAIRS provided good search performance by indexing every word in a document except user-selectable stop words, usually common words such as "and" or "the."

Two levels of index were used, a dictionary containing one occurrence of each word, and an inverted text file storing document identification and position information for each occurrence of each word. The actual document text was stored in a third text file.

STAIRS document databases could only be updated off-line. The data (in the non-CMS implementations) was stored in basic direct access method (BDAM) files, which caused upgrade and portability problems later in its life-cycle.

== See also ==
- BRS/Search
- Mistral (software)
