= BRS/Search =

BRS/Search is a full-text database and information retrieval system. BRS/Search uses a fully inverted indexing system to store, locate, and retrieve unstructured data. It was the search engine that in 1977 powered Bibliographic Retrieval Services (BRS) commercial operations with 20 databases (including the first national commercial availability of MEDLINE); it has changed ownership several times during its development and is currently sold as Livelink ECM Discovery Server by Open Text Corporation.

== Early development ==
Development on what was to become BRS began as Biomedical Communications Network (BCN) at the State University of New York at Albany (SUNY). BCN, which went online in 1968, provided on-line access to nine databases, including MEDLINE and BIOSIS Previews, to large universities and medical schools primarily in the Northeast of the USA. State funding for the project was withdrawn in 1975, and Bibliographic Retrieval Services (BRS) was formed as a non-profit concern the following year. It was incorporated in May 1976 as a for-profit corporation with Ron Quake as president, Jan Egeland as vice president in charge of marketing and training, and Lloyd Palmer as vice president of systems.

== BRS commercial operations ==
In December 1976, the First BRS User Meeting was held in Syracuse, New York, and by January 1977 BRS started commercial operations with 20 databases (including the first national commercial availability of MEDLINE) and 9 million records, using modified IBM STAIRS (STorage And Information Retrieval System) software, Telenet for telecommunications, and timesharing mainframe computers of Carrier Corporation. In October 1980 BRS was sold by Egeland and Quake to Indian Head, Inc., a subsidiary of the Dutch company Thyssen-Bornemisza Group.

== 1989–1993 ==
In 1989 Robert Maxwell acquired BRS and the BRS/Search software; he announced the planned incorporation of the ORBIT Search Service and BRS Information Technologies and renamed the whole group Maxwell Online, Inc. At that time BRS Information Technologies was serving the medical and academic library marketplace with over 150 databases. Maxwell later bought the publishing company Macmillan and put Maxwell Online under Macmillan. In the same year BRS/LINK (hypertext connection of databases; first application delivering full text) was announced.

The initial BRS/LINK application "relates the citation in a bibliographic database to its full-text article in a second database," and "eliminates the need to re-execute a search strategy in the second database in order to find the corresponding full-text article." Initially BRS/LINK supported linking only selected bibliographic databases: MEDLINE, Health Planning and Administration, and MEDLINE References on AIDS to the full-text Comprehensive Core Medical Library.

At the time of Robert Maxwell’s death in 1991, Macmillan brought in Andrew Gregory to represent the company during the 2 years that Maxwell’s affairs were being settled and to prepare Maxwell Online to be able to sell the components. Maxwell Online shortly thereafter underwent yet another name change, this time to InfoPro Technologies.

== Dataware Technologies ownership of BRS/SEARCH ==
Early in 1994, InfoPro Technologies, a subsidiary of MHC Inc. (holding company for Macmillan Inc.), the former Maxwell Online service, sold off all its subsidiaries. ORBIT Search Services went to the French-owned Questel, the dial-up BRS Search Services to CD Plus Technologies (later to become OVID), and BRS Software Products (including BRS/SEARCH) to Dataware Technologies. Almost up to the end of InfoPro Technologies, BRS Software had been the fastest growing segment of the company.

At the 14th BRS North American Users Group Conference in 1999, Dave Schubmehl of Dataware Technologies presented a paper in which he stated "The purpose of this presentation is to update BRS users on upcoming releases of BRS/Search, NetAnswer, and other Dataware products. BRS/Search 7.0 will include features specifically requested by customers, as well as other enhancements. Earlier this year, Dataware acquired Sovereign Hill Software, makers of InQuery. In light of that acquisition, and Dataware's other development projects, we'll look at Dataware's plans for all products, including BRS/Search and NetAnswer."

== Open Text acquisition of BRS/Search ==
In 2001 BRS/Search was acquired by Open Text and became LiveLink ECM Discovery Server. It is now referred to as Open Text Discovery Server. Open Text still supports both BRS/Search and NetAnswer.

The core BRS/Search technology in the Open Text portfolio was augmented with other capabilities through various acquisitions. For example, Dataware's acquisition of Sovereign-Hill brought InQuery, “a probabilistic information retrieval system using an inference network”, which was developed by the University of Massachusetts Amherst Center for Intelligent Information Retrieval] out of the UMass CIIR and into the marketplace. A product re-branding table shows the range of products, their old names and their new names.

InQuery is a concept search engine that uses noun phrases, parts of speech and other co-occurrence relationships in overlapping passages of text rather than single term inverted indexes of single words in documents.

Open Text's portfolio has grown to include Hummingbird Content Management, and has always included BASIS.

== 2003 ==
BRS/Search North America User's Group (BRSNAUG) website with a June 8, 2003 date listed the following features for BRS/Search. The BRSNAUG also disincorporated in 2003. Cross-references to BRS/Search on the World Wide Web point to Open Text Livelink.

Engine features include:
- Rapid query response time.
- Numerical data handling and elementary statistical processing (sum, avg, min, max)
- Search results weighting and relevancy ranking
- Left- and right-truncation and expansion of search terms
- Superior data compression – loaded databases typically use only about 1.5 times the input stream size in disk space
- Large capacity databases – up to 100 million documents, each with up to 65,000 paragraphs
- Fine control of indexing and searching – right down to the word, sentence, and paragraph level
- Fine control over data security. Document access can be controlled at the database, document, and paragraph level
- International language support for all 7/8 bit characters sets and customizable language tables
- Flexible and customizable stop word lists
- ANSI-compatible thesauri
- Hypertext links within and between documents and databases (R6.x)
- Support for natural language parsing of queries
- Automatic document summarization tools
- Client/Server development
- Programming interfaces for World-Wide Web (HTTP, HTML) access to databases

== See also ==
- Mistral (software)
