= Siris 8 =

Operating system for Iris 80 and Mitra 15 computers

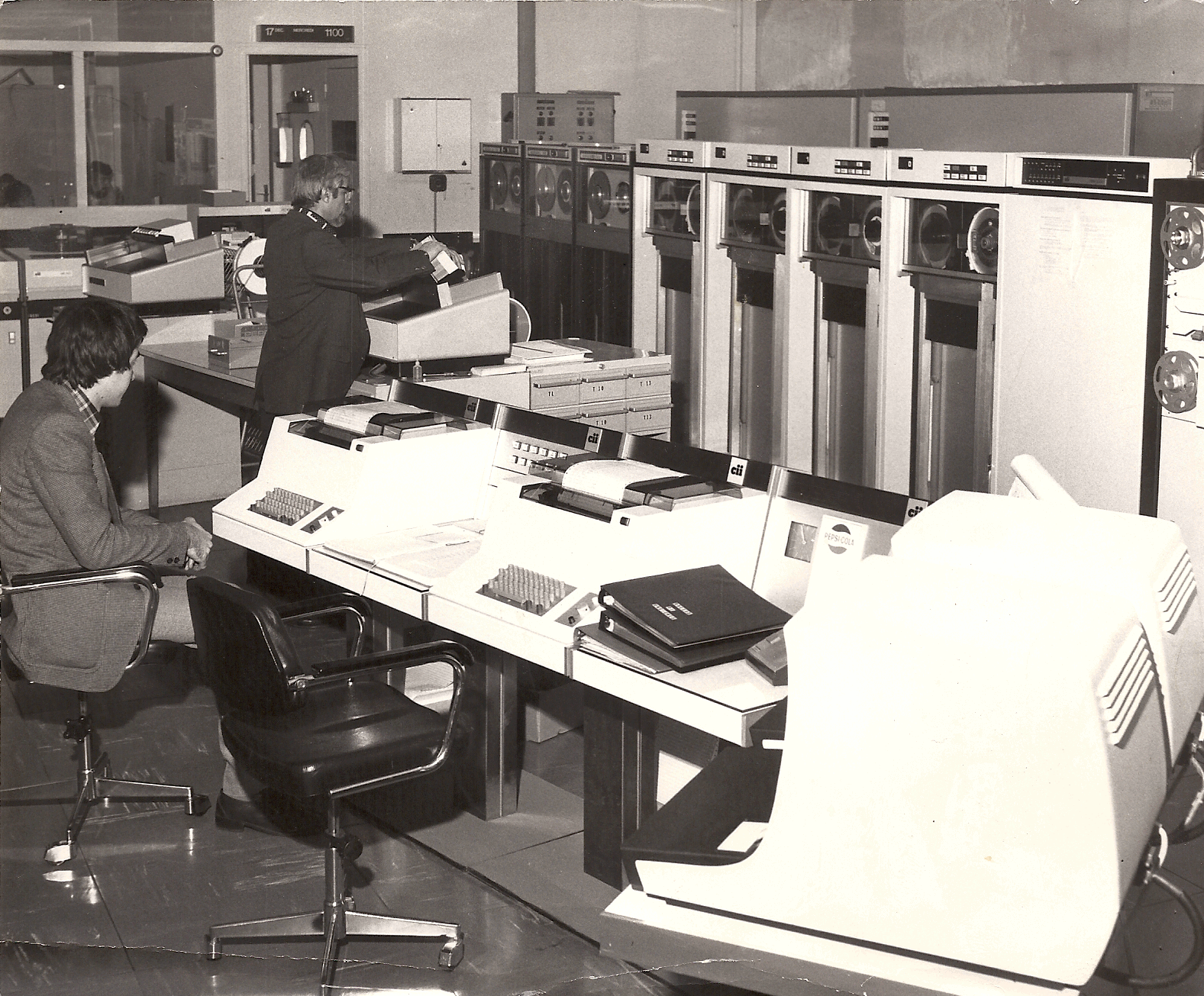
Iris 80 computer at the Institut universitaire de calcul automatique de Lorraine (IUCAL) in Nancy in 1977.

Siris 8 is a discontinued operating system developed by the French company CII for its Iris 80 and Mitra 15 computers. It was later replaced by Honeywell DPS 7.

Jean Ichbiah worked at CII on the rewrite of the Siris 7 operating system of the Iris 80 to create a more successful version, used to operate a three processor Iris 80 in Évry.

The first version of Siris 8 offered full compatibility with applications running on its predecessor Siris 7. Among its strong points were its excellent memory management, which took advantage of the extended virtual addresses and spaces of the Iris 80.

Siris 8 was suitable for both scientific and business computing, as well as real-time applications.

The first delivery of the uniprocessor version occurred in February 1972, and the dual-processor version in September 1972 for the French Atomic Energy Commission (CEA) Commissariat à l'énergie atomique. Siris 8 also included Transiris, networking software for transporting data to other computers.

After the CII merger with Honeywell-Bull, the functionality of Siris was adapted for the GCOS system through an emulation processes, which made it possible to retain all of the Siris 8 customers. The final version of Siris 8, C10, was shipped in 1976.

== Characteristics ==
Before demand paged virtual memory was added in 1975, Siris 8 was described as having "two core partitions... one for resident 'batch' tasks, one for swapped time-shared tasks."

It operated in four separate modes:

- Batch processing comprising, local and remote
- Transaction processing
- Time sharing
- Real-time processing.

The Siris 8 monitor consisted of a permanently resident portion and pageable segments.

Batch jobs could be entered through the local or a remote card reader, or by the console operator. Timesharing could be started and stopped by the operator. A timesharing job was started by the DEMON task, which performed all terminal I/O. The system maintained three types of queues of work. The multiprogramming queue could run multiple jobs at a time, with jobs scheduled by priority. One to five Operational queues (Files d'attente d'exploitation) could run one job in each at a time, queued strictly by arrival time. A cataloged job queue was used for jobs submitted by the console operator; multiple jobs from this queue could be active at one time.

Real-time jobs had access to special system services such as "[s]witching from slave mode to master mode and vice versa, time delays, abort recoveries."

Transaction processing was performed by a subsystem called STRATEGE.

The virtual address space available to the user could be up to 32 segments of 128 K (32-bit) words, or 16 MB.
