= Xos, Inc. =

American electric truck manufacturer

- Company type: Public
- Traded as: Nasdaq: XOS
- Industry: Automotive
- Founded: 2016
- Headquarters: Los Angeles, California, U.S.
- Key people: Dakota Semler (Chairman of The Board and CEO)
- Products: Electric trucks
- Website: www.xostrucks.com

Xos, Inc. (pronounced ék-so-s) is an American manufacturer of commercial electric vehicles (EVs) and mobile EV chargers.

== History ==
The company was founded in 2016 and went public in 2021.

== Products ==
=== Vehicles ===
The company manufactures electric commercial vehicles, primarily electric step vans. As of the end of 2025, it has delivered more than 1,000 vehicles in total.

The company's customers include UPS and FedEx Ground operators and the armored transport company Loomis.

Future products announced by the company include a medium-duty box truck/chassis cab.

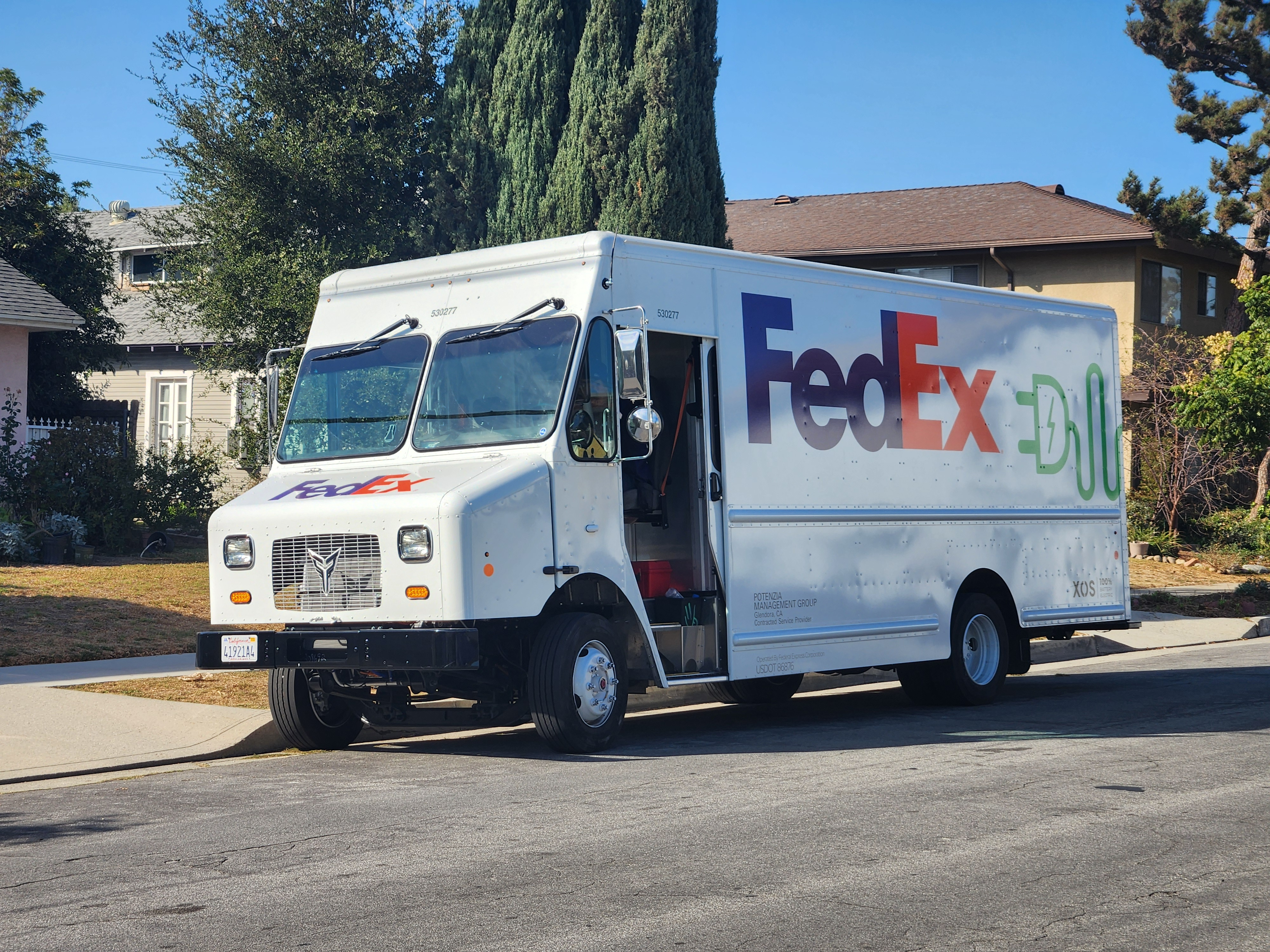
Xos step van; body by Morgan Olson

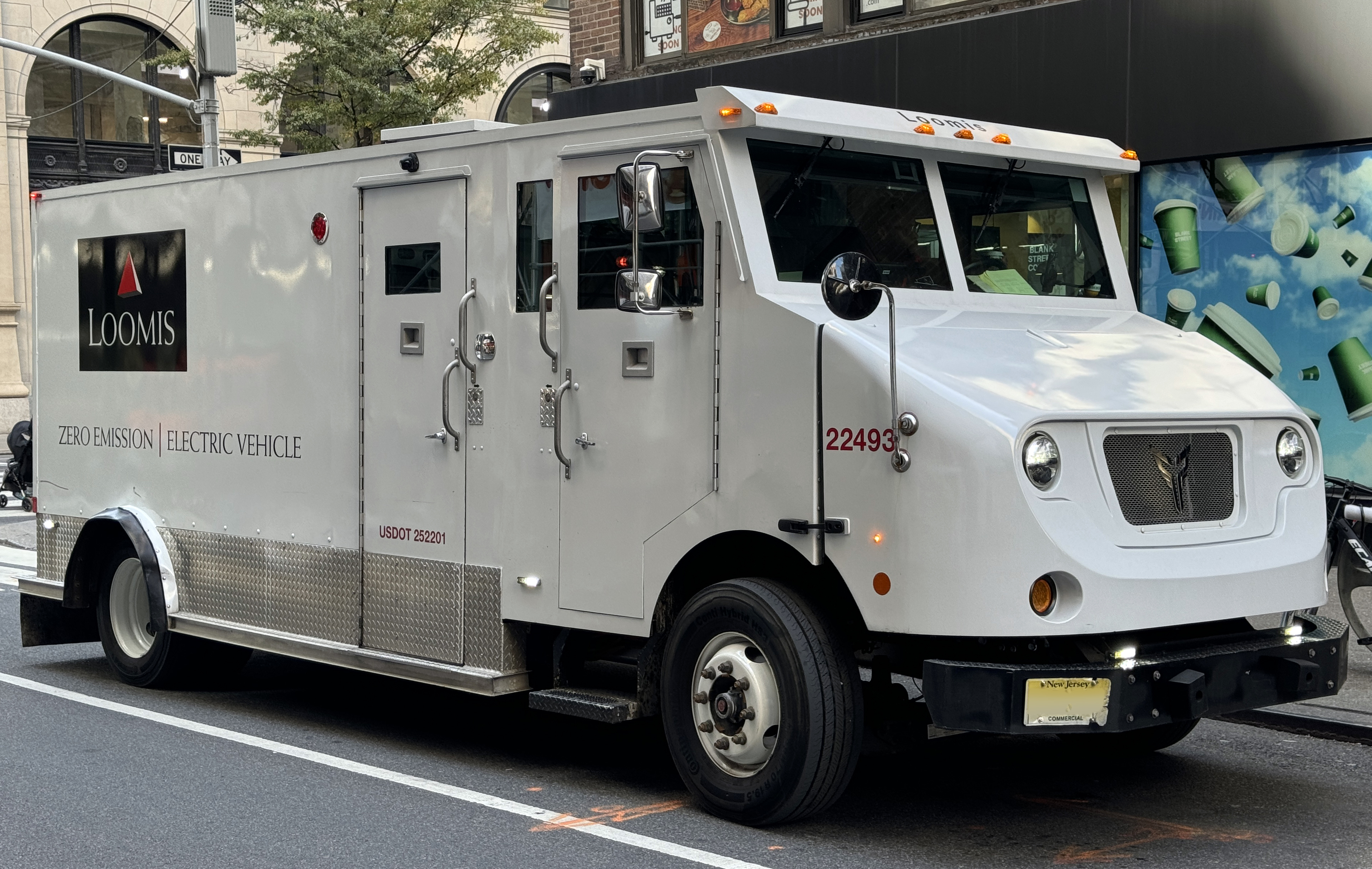
Xos armored van developed with Loomis

=== Charging infrastructure ===
The company also provides charging infrastructure for electric vehicle fleets.

In June 2025, Leap, a virtual power plant (VPP) platform, partnered with Xos to integrate Xos Hub, a mobile battery-integrated charger, with Leap's VPP software. This collaboration enables Xos customers, including major logistics firms like FedEx and UPS, to participate in California's Demand Side Grid Support (DSGS) program, allowing fleets to shift charging to Xos Hub batteries during peak grid demand, reducing grid strain and generating revenue.
