= HexInput =

On-screen keyboard

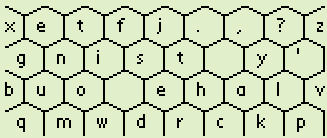
A HexInput keyboard

HexInput, as originally described, is an on-screen keyboard with the following characteristics:

- Keys are activated (pressed) either by tapping on each key in turn (the usual approach for on-screen keyboards) or by dragging a path over the desired keys. Unlike ShapeWriter, every key dragged over is considered pressed, so the sequence of keypresses is deterministic and predictable.
- Most keys are hexagonal, arranged in a honeycomb pattern. This allows most keys to have six neighbouring keys that one can drag into without entering any other keys.
- Letters are arranged to optimize text input in a particular language (English, for example). Note that this may mean that some common letters may appear twice.

The name ‘HexInput’ is unfortunate: in computing, ‘hex’ tends to mean hexadecimal notation, though it may be argued that a general text input method is named for general users, not just those with computing backgrounds. The use of hexagons is not essential to the idea, though they do maximize the available area per cell and the number of easily reachable neighbors per cell.

The original exposition included an alternative layout using squares (keys having four neighbours unless at an edge of the keyboard), and a later edition depicted an essentially honeycomb pattern but some hexagons split in half. Alternatively (not mentioned in the original exposition), one could leave gaps between keys so that one can drag through gaps to reach a larger number of “neighboring” keys.

The HexInput concept is available for Palm OS devices via myKbd, where it is now known as the "QUONG" layout (after the first five letters in the top row).

ATOMIK is a closely related input concept from researchers at IBM.
