= Merger mania =

Period of high activity in corporate mergers and acquisitions

The term "merger mania", as used in financial and law journals, describes a period of high activity in corporate mergers and acquisitions (M&A), with some merged companies then merging yet again into other companies within a few years. The term has been used for more than 37 years.

The term merger mania is often used to describe the business activities of the 1990s, where many companies (or corporations), formerly separate for decades, were frequently merged, then some re-merged into other companies within a few years, with the resulting merged companies sometimes declaring bankruptcy. The mergers were facilitated by changes in corporate law which no longer separated various types of businesses previously limited from interlocking directorates and antitrust concerns.

Several companies founded in the early 20th century had ceased to exist by the end of the 1990s, due to mergers.

== See also ==
- Poison pill
