= Xerox Operating System =

Xerox Operating System (XOS)
- Developer: CII
- Working state: Historic
- Platforms: SDS Sigma series

The Xerox Operating System (XOS) was an operating system for the XDS Sigma series of computers "optimized for direct replacement of IBM DOS/360 installations" and to provide real-time and timesharing support.

The system was developed, beginning in 1969, for Xerox by the French firm CII (now Bull).

XOS was more successful in Europe than in the US, but was unable to compete with IBM. By 1972 there were 35 XOS installations in Europe, compared to 2 in the US.
