= CII Iris 50 =

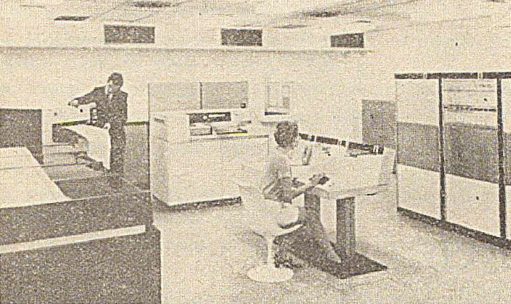
- General view over a CII Iris 50
- Generation: 2nd
- Released: 1968
- Discontinued: 1975
- Operating system: Siris 7
- CPU: DTL, 32 bits. Developed in-house from the Sigma 7 architecture.
- Memory: Core memory, 256K @ 2 MB/sec
- Storage: Magnetic tape readers, hard disks (2 MB to 100 MB)
- Predecessor: CII 10070
- Successor: CII Iris 80

The Iris 50 computer is one of the computers marketed by the French company CII as part of plan Calcul at the end of the 1960s. Designed for the civilian market, it was produced from 1968 to 1975 and was the successor to the CII 10070 (SDS Sigma 7). Its main competitor in Europe was the IBM 360/50, which, like the Iris 50, was a universal 32 bits mainframe suitable for both business and scientific applications.

At the same time that the CII was building the Iris 50, it had to study military variants for the army called P0M, P2M, and P2MS. The Iris 35 M version, used in particular to process the information needed to fire the Pluton missile, had a magnetic core memory made up of elements of 16 kilobytes each; tolerant of severe environmental conditions. Its main peripherals were a printer, a monitor, and modems.

CII concluded that it was impossible to create another CPU compatible with Iris 50. It then decided to adopt the Sigma 9 architecture for the Iris 80, inspired by the Sigma 7 and marketed by Société européenne de traitement de l'information (SETI), one of the three companies that had merged in 1966 to create CII.

The operating system for the Iris 50 was Siris 7, designed and developed by CII.

Its successor, the Iris 80, was considerably transformed and improved, both in terms of the components, which moved from DTL to TTL, and the operating system (Siris 7/8) on which the IRIA researchers worked to increase its speed.

A slower-speed version, the Iris 45, was introduced in 1972.
