= Plan Calcul =

French governmental program

Plan Calcul was a French governmental program to promote a national or European computer industry and associated research and education activities.

== History ==
The plan was approved in July 1966 by President Charles de Gaulle, in the aftermath of two key events that made his government worry about French dependence on the US computer industry. In the mid-1960s, the United States denied export licenses for American-made IBM and CDC computers to the French Commissariat à l'énergie atomique in order to prevent it from perfecting its H bomb. Meanwhile, in 1964, General Electric had acquired a majority of Compagnie des Machines Bull, the largest French computer manufacturer, which had the second highest market share in France, after IBM, and was a leading IT equipment maker in Europe. Following this partial takeover, known as "Affaire Bull", GE-Bull dropped two Bull computers from its product line.

Responsibility for administering the plan was given to a newly created government agency, Délégation générale à l'informatique (Information Bureau), answering directly to the prime minister.

== Compagnie Internationale d'Informatique ==
Compagnie Internationale d'Informatique
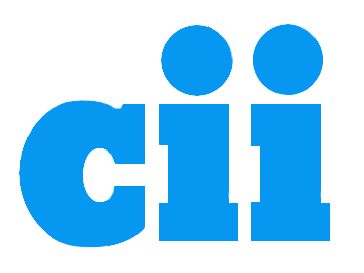
- Company type: Part of the Plan Calcul governmental program
- Industry: Computer manufacturer
- Founded: 1966
- Defunct: 1976
- Fate: Absorbed by Honeywell-Bull
- Owner: Thomson-CSF

As part of the program, in December 1966, the Compagnie Internationale d'Informatique (CII) was established as a manufacturer of commercial and scientific computers, initially under licence from Scientific Data Systems. The new company was intended to compete not only in the process control and military market, where its staff was already seasoned, but also in the office computing sector of the French market, where IBM and Bull were dominant at the time. The plan enacted government subsidies for CII between 1967 and 1971, and was reconducted for another four years. A minor side of the plan was devoted to peripherals, while CII's main parent company, Thomson-CSF, received government support to develop its semiconductor plants and R & D. Overall, while CII mainframes benefitted from preferential procurement by the French government, the Plan Calcul left peripherals, components and small computers makers to compete on the free market. The same went for software companies, which were already thriving in France.

On the research side, the program also led to the creation of L'Institut de recherche en informatique et en automatique (IRIA) in 1967, which later became INRIA. It was accompanied with a vast educational effort in programming and computer science.

In the late 1960s, CII announced its new, internally designed mainframes Iris 50 [1970] and Iris 80 [1971], and developed a mini-computer, Mitra 15 (1971), which became a commercial success in the following decade. The company also was a minority participant in the production of magnetic peripherals thru part ownership of Magnetic Peripherals Inc.

As of 1971 IBM had more than 50% market share in almost every European country. Information Bureau head Maurice Allègre warned that international cooperation was necessary, however, as "something must happen or there won't be a European computer industry". The French government had spent more than $100 million on Plan Calcul in the first five years, and planned to spend more than that amount in the next five. France expected CII to reach $200 million in revenue before 1975. That year, CII began negotiations with Siemens and Philips to form a joint European company, Unidata, which shipped its first computers in 1974. Yet a new President of the Republic was elected then, former Finance minister Giscard d'Estaing, who was a strong opponent of the Plan Calcul; meanwhile, CII's sleeping partner, CGE-Alcatel, woke up to oppose the domination of its archrival Siemens over the European computer industry. Unidata was terminated and CII was absorbed into Honeywell-Bull in 1976.

This government initiative was ultimately deemed a failure.

== See also ==
- Quaero
- Cloudwatt
