= Xerox Star =

Early GUI-based computer workstation from Xerox

Xerox Star workstation
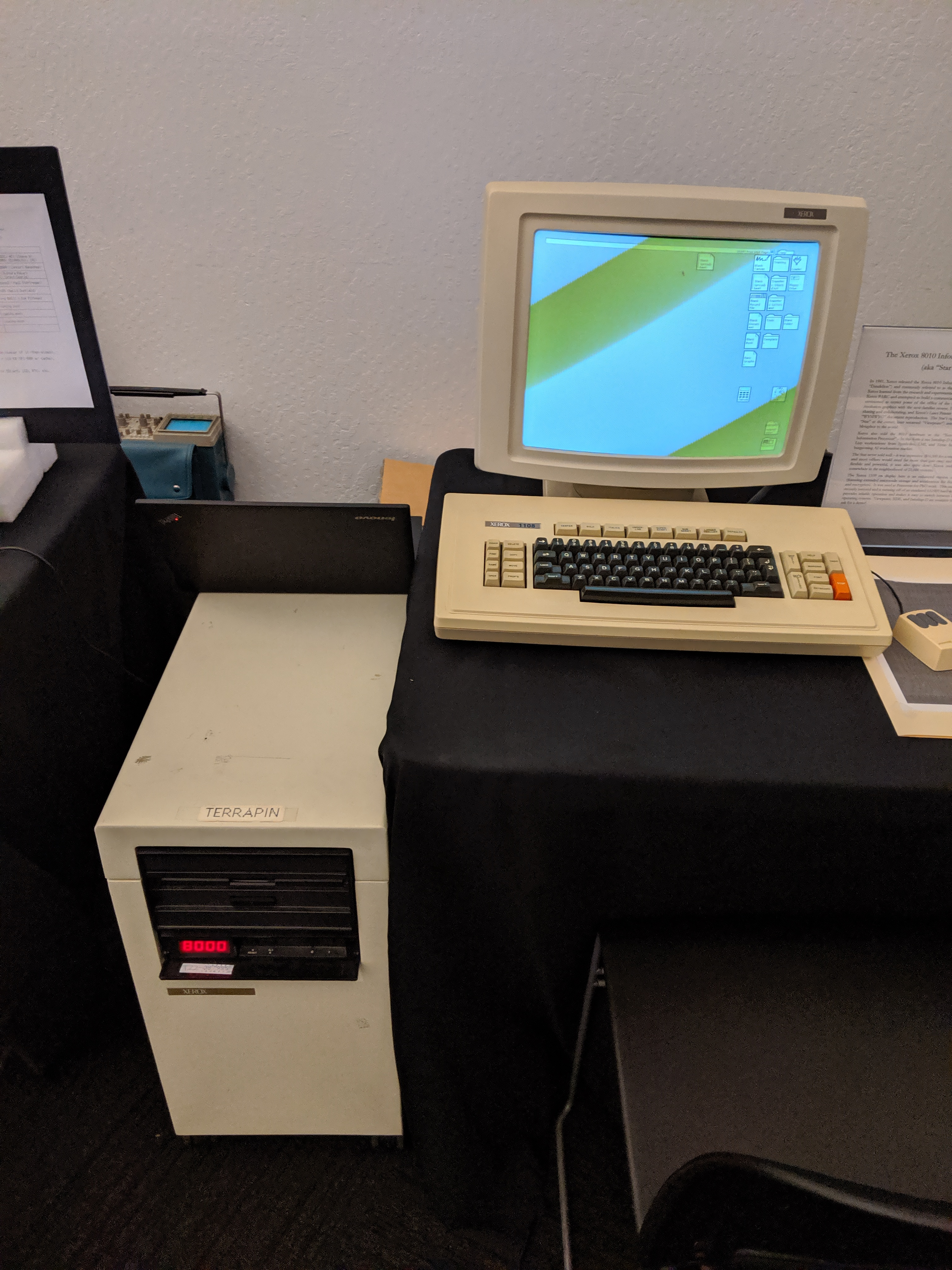
- Xerox Star 8010
- Also known as: Xerox 8010 Information System
- Developer: Xerox
- Manufacturer: Xerox
- Product family: 8000-series
- Type: Workstation
- Released: 1981; 45 years ago
- Introductory price: US$16,595 (equivalent to $59,000 in 2025)
- Discontinued: 1985
- Operating system: Pilot
- CPU: AMD Am2900 based
- Memory: 384 KB, expandable to 1.5 MB
- Storage: 10, 29, or 40 MB hard drive and 8" floppy drive
- Display: 17 inch
- Graphics: 1024×808 pixels @ 38.7 Hz
- Connectivity: Ethernet
- Predecessor: Xerox Alto
- Successor: Xerox Daybreak (ViewPoint; Xerox 6085)

The Xerox Star workstation, officially named Xerox Star 8010 Information System, is the first commercial personal computer to incorporate technologies that have since become standard in personal computers, including a bitmapped display, a window-based graphical user interface, icons, folders, mouse (two-button), Ethernet networking, file servers, print servers, and email.

Introduced by Xerox Corporation on April 27, 1981, the name Star technically refers only to the software sold with the system for the office automation market. The 8010 workstations were also sold with software based on the programming languages Lisp and Smalltalk for the smaller research and software development market.

== History ==
=== The Xerox Alto ===
The Xerox Star system's concept owes much to the Xerox Alto, an experimental workstation designed by the Xerox Palo Alto Research Center (PARC). The first Alto became operational in 1972. The Alto had been strongly influenced by what its designers had seen previously with the NLS computer system at the Stanford Research Institute and PLATO at University of Illinois. At first, only a few Altos had been built. Although by 1979 nearly 1,000 Ethernet-linked Altos had been put into operation at Xerox and another 500 at collaborating universities and government offices, it was never intended to be a commercial product.

=== The Star development process ===
In 1977, Xerox started a development project which worked to incorporate the Alto innovations into a commercial product; their concept was an integrated document preparation system, centered on the expensive laser printing technology and targeted at large corporations and their trading partners. When the resulting Star system was announced in 1981, the cost was about US$75,000 (equivalent to $266,000 in 2025) for a basic system, and US$16,000 (equivalent to $57,000 in 2025) for each added workstation. A base system includes an 8010 Star workstation, and an 8010 dedicated as a server (with RS232 I/O), and a floor-standing laser printer. The server software includes a File Server, a Print Server, and distributed services (Mail Server, Clearinghouse Name Server / Directory, and Authentication Server). Xerox Memorywriter typewriters can connect to this system over dial-up connections and send email, using the Memorywriter as a teleprinter.

The Star was developed at Xerox's Systems Development Department (SDD) in El Segundo, California, which had been established in 1977 under the direction of Don Massaro. SDD North was located in Palo Alto, California, including some people borrowed from PARC. SDD's mission was to design the "Office of the future", a new system to incorporate the best features of the Alto, have ease of use, and to automate many office tasks.

The development team was headed by David Liddle, and grew to more than 200 developers. Much of the first year was taken up by meetings and planning, resulting in an extensive and detailed functional specification, internally termed the Red Book. This became the bible for all development tasks. It defined the interface and enforced consistency in all modules and tasks. All changes to the functional specification had to be approved by a review team which maintained standards rigorously.

One group in Palo Alto worked on the underlying operating system interface to the hardware and programming tools. Teams in El Segundo and Palo Alto collaborated on developing the user interface and user applications.

The staff relied heavily on the technologies they were working on: file sharing, print servers, and email. They were even connected to the Internet, then named ARPANET, which helped them communicate between El Segundo and Palo Alto.

The Star was implemented in the programming language Mesa, a direct precursor to Modula-2 and Modula-3. Mesa is not object-oriented, but includes processes (threads) and monitors (mutexes) in the language. Mesa requires creating two files for every module: a definition module specified data structures and procedures for each object, and one or more implementation modules contained the code for the procedures. Traits is a programming convention used to implement object-oriented capabilities and multiple inheritance in the customer environment of Star and Viewpoint.

The Star team used a sophisticated integrated development environment (IDE), codenamed Tajo and externally named Xerox Development Environment (XDE). Tajo has many similarities with the Smalltalk-80 environment, but has many added tools, such as the version control system DF, which requires programmers to check out modules before they are changed. Any change in a module which force changes in dependent modules are closely tracked and documented. Changes to lower level modules require various levels of approval.

The software development process was intense. It involved much prototyping and user testing. The software engineers had to develop new network communications protocols and data-encoding schemes when those used in PARC's research environment proved inadequate.

Initially, all development was done on Alto workstations. These were not well suited to the extreme burdens placed by the software. Even the processor intended for the product proved inadequate and involved a last minute hardware redesign. Many software redesigns, rewrites, and late additions had to be made, variously based on results from user testing, and marketing and systems considerations.

A Japanese language version of the system was produced in conjunction with Fuji Xerox, code named J-Star, and full support for international customers.

In the end, many features from the Star Functional Specification were not implemented. The product had to get to market, and the last several months before release focused on reliability and performance.

== User interface ==
Compound document and desktop of 8010/40 system

Windowed interface with scrollbars and greyscale graphics

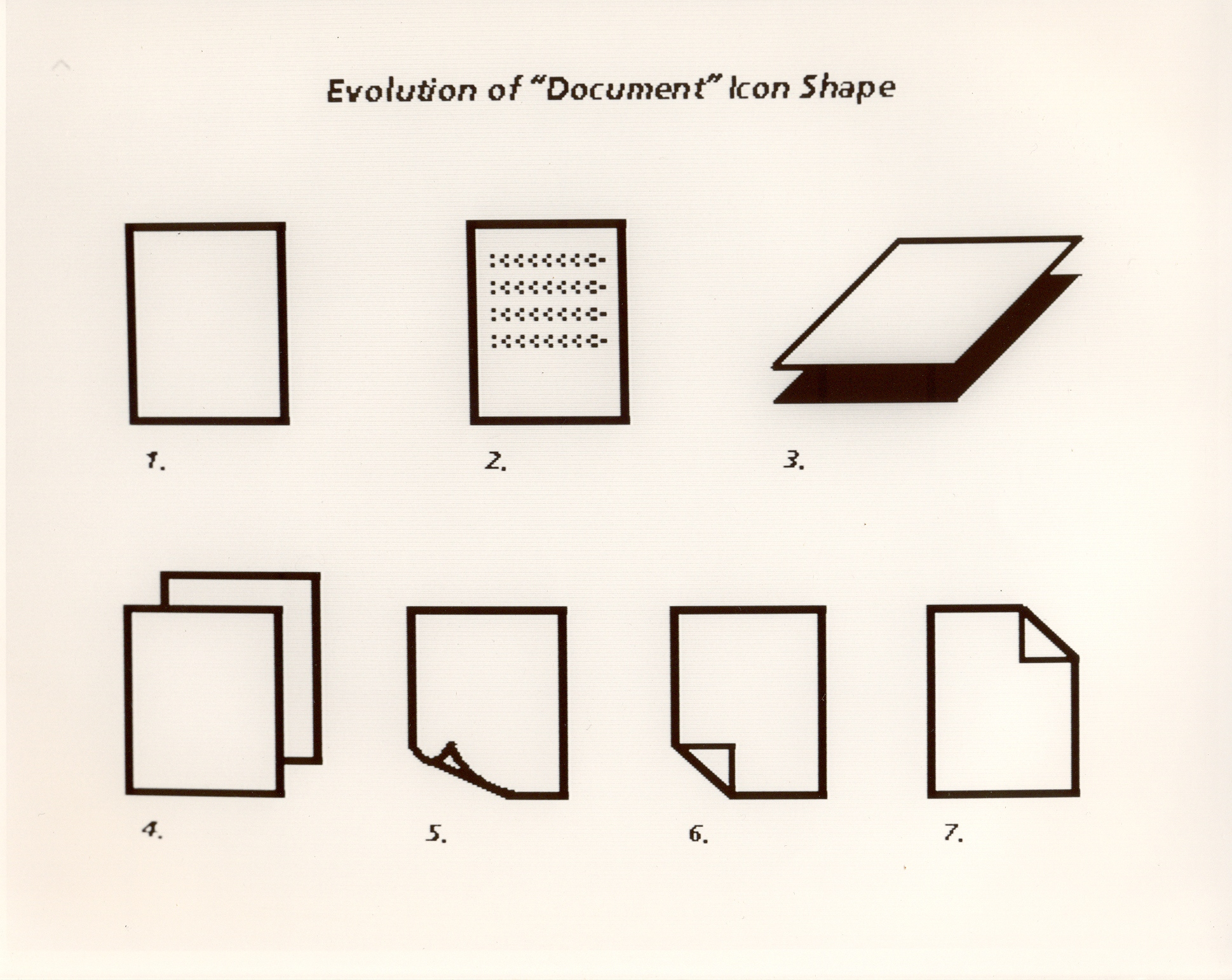
Evolution of the used document icon shape

The key philosophy of the user interface is to mimic the office paradigm as much as possible to make it intuitive for users. The concept of "what you see is what you get" (WYSIWYG) was considered paramount. Text is displayed as black on a white background, just like paper, and the printer replicates the screen using Interpress, a page description language developed at PARC.

One of the main designers of the Star, Dr. David Canfield Smith, invented the concept of computer icons and the desktop metaphor, in which the user sees a desktop containing documents and folders, with different icons representing different types of documents. Clicking any icon opens a window. Users do not start programs first (such as a text editor, graphics program, or spreadsheet software), but simply open the file and the appropriate application appears.

The Star user interface is based on the concept of objects. For example, a word processing document holds page objects, paragraph objects, sentence objects, word objects, and character objects. The user selects objects by clicking on them with the mouse, and press dedicated special keys on the keyboard to invoke standard object functions (open, delete, copy, move) in a uniform way. There was also a "Show Properties" key used to display settings, called property sheets, for the particular object (such as font size for a character object). These general conventions greatly simplify the menu structure of all the programs.

Object integration was designed into the system from the start. For example, a chart object created in the graphing module can be inserted into any type of document. Eventually, Apple delivered this ability in the Lisa operating system, and on Macintosh as Publish and Subscribe. It became available on Microsoft Windows with the introduction of Object Linking and Embedding (OLE) in 1990. This approach was later used on the OpenDoc software platform in the late 1990s, and in the AppleWorks (originally ClarisWorks) package for the Macintosh in 1991 and Windows in 1993.

== Hardware ==
Initially, the Star software was to run on a new series of virtual-memory processors. The D* (pronounced D-Star) series of machines has names beginning with that letter. They are all microprogrammed processors; for the Star software, microcode is loaded to implement an instruction set designed for Mesa. It was possible to load microcode for the Interlisp or Smalltalk environments, but these three environments can not run at the same time.

The Dolphin (aka D0), built with transistor–transistor logic (TTL) technology, included 74S181 ALUs. It was intended to be the Star workstation, but its cost was deemed too high for the project goals. The complexity of the software eventually overwhelmed its limited configuration. At one time in Star's development, it took more than half an hour to reboot the system.

The next generation of these machines, the Dorado, a.k.a. D1, used an emitter-coupled logic (ECL) processor. It was four times faster than Dandelion on standard benchmarks, and thus competitive with the fastest super minicomputers of the day. It was used for research, but was a rack-mounted CPU that was never intended to be an office product. A network router called Dicentra is based on this design.

The released Star workstation hardware is called Dandelion (often shortened to "Dlion"). It is based on a design from a PARC technical report, Wildflower: An Architecture for a Personal Computer, by Butler Lampson. It is based on the AMD Am2900 bitslice microprocessor technology. An enhanced version of the Dandelion, with more microcode space, was dubbed Dandetiger.

The base Dandelion system has 384 KB memory (expandable to 1.5 MB), a 10 MB, 29 MB or 40 MB 8-inch hard drive, an 8-inch floppy drive, mouse, and Ethernet. The performance of this machine, which sold for US$20,000 (equivalent to $71,000 in 2025), is about 850 in the Dhrystone benchmark — comparable to that of a VAX-11/750, which cost five as much. The 17 in (43 cm) cathode-ray tube (CRT) display (black and white, 1024×808 pixels with 38.7 Hz refresh) is large for the time. It can display two 8.5×11-inch pages side by side in true size. The overscan area (borders) can be programmed with a 16×16 repeating pattern, to extend the root window pattern to all the edges of the monitor.

The D-Star machines were commercialized as:

- Dolphin: Xerox 1100 Scientific Information Processor Lisp machine, (1979)
- Dorado: Xerox 1132 Lisp machine
- Dandelion: Star, Xerox 1108 Lisp machine (1981)
- Dandetiger: Xerox 1109 Lisp machine
- Daybreak: Xerox 6085 Star successor, Xerox 1186 Lisp machine (1985)

== Marketing and commercial reception ==
Rank Xerox brochure for 8010/40 system

The Xerox Star was not originally meant to be a stand-alone computer, but to be part of an integrated Xerox "personal office system" that also connected to other workstations and network services via Ethernet. Although a single unit sold for $16,000, a typical office would need to buy at least two or three machines along with a file server and a name server/print server. Spending $50,000 to 100,000 for a complete installation was not an easy sale, when a secretary's annual salary was about $12,000 and a VIC-20 cost around $300.

Later incarnations of the Star allow users to buy one unit with a laser printer, but only about 25,000 units were sold, leading many to consider it a commercial failure.

The workstation was originally designed to run the Star software for performing office tasks, but it was also sold with different software for other markets. These other configurations included a workstation for Interlisp or Smalltalk, and a server.

Some have said that the Star was ahead of its time, that few outside of a small circle of developers really understood the potential of the system, considering that IBM introduced its 8088-based IBM PC running the comparatively primitive PC DOS the same year as the Star. However, comparison with the IBM PC may be irrelevant: well before it was introduced, buyers in the word processing industry were aware of the 8086-based IBM Displaywriter, the full-page portrait black-on-white Xerox 860 page display system and the 120 page-per-minute Xerox 9700 laser printer. Furthermore, the design principles of Smalltalk and modeless working had been extensively discussed in the August 1981 issue of Byte magazine, so Xerox PARC's standing and the potential of the Star can scarcely have been lost on its target (office systems) market, who would never have expected IBM to position a mass-market PC to threaten far more profitable dedicated WP systems. Unfortunately, the influential niche market of pioneering players in electronic publishing such as Longman were already aligning their production processes towards generic markup languages such as SGML (forerunner of HTML and XML) whereby authors using inexpensive offline systems could describe document structure, making their manuscripts ready for transfer to computer to film systems that offered far higher resolution than the then maximum of 360 dpi laser printing technologies.

Another possible reason given for the lack of success of the Star was Xerox's corporate structure. A longtime copier company, Xerox played to their strengths. They already had one significant failure in making their acquisition of Scientific Data Systems pay off. It is said that there were internal jealousies between the old line copier systems divisions that were responsible for bulk of Xerox's revenues and the new upstart division. Their marketing efforts were seen by some as half-hearted or unfocused. Furthermore, the most technically savvy sales representatives that might have sold office automation equipment were paid large commissions on leases of laser printer equipment costing up to a half-million dollars. No commission structure for decentralized systems could compete. The multi-lingual technical documentation market was also a major opportunity, but this needed cross-border collaboration for which few sales organisations were ready at the time.

Even within Xerox Corporation, in the mid-1980s, there was little understanding of the system. Few corporate executives ever saw or used the system, and the sales teams, if they requested a computer to assist with their planning, would instead receive older, CP/M-based Xerox 820 or 820-II systems. There was no effort to seed the 8010/8012 Star systems within Xerox Corporation.

Probably most significantly, strategic planners at the Xerox Systems Group (XSG) felt that they could not compete against other workstation makers such as Apollo Computer or Symbolics. The Xerox name alone was considered their greatest asset, but it did not produce customers.

Finally, by later standards, the system would be considered very slow, due partly to the limited hardware of the time, and partly to a poorly implemented file system; saving a large file could take minutes. Crashes can be followed by an hours-long process called file scavenging, signaled by the appearance of the diagnostic code 7511 in the top left corner of the screen.

The successor to the Star, the Xerox 6085 PCS, uses a different, more efficient hardware platform, Daybreak, using a new, faster processor, and accompanied by significant rewriting of the Star software, renamed ViewPoint, to improve performance. The new system was released in 1985. The new hardware provided 1 MB to 4 MB of memory, a 10 MB to 80 MB hard disk, a 15" or 19" display, a 5.25" floppy drive, a mouse, Ethernet connection and a price of a little over $6,000.

The Xerox 6085 could be sold along with an attached laser printer as a standalone system. Also offered was a PC compatibility mode via an 80186-based expansion board. Users could transfer files between the ViewPoint system and PC-based software, albeit with some difficulty because the file formats were incompatible with any on the PC. But even with a significantly lower price, it was still a Rolls-Royce in the world of lower-cost $2,000 personal computers.

In 1989, Viewpoint 2.0 introduced many new applications related to desktop publishing. Eventually, Xerox jettisoned the integrated hardware/software workstation offered by Viewpoint and offered a software-only product called GlobalView, providing the Star interface and technology on an IBM PC compatible platform. The initial release required installing a Mesa CPU add-on board. The final release of GlobalView 2.1 in 1996 ran as an emulator on Solaris, Microsoft Windows 3.1, Windows 95, or Windows 98, and OS/2.

== Legacy ==
Even though the Star product failed in the market, it raised expectations and laid important groundwork for later computers. Many of the innovations behind the Star, such as WYSIWYG editing, Ethernet, and network services such as directory, print, file, and internetwork routing have become commonplace in computers.

Members of the Apple Lisa engineering team saw Star at its introduction at the National Computer Conference (NCC '81) and returned to Cupertino where they converted their desktop manager to an icon-based interface modeled on the Star. Among the developers of Xerox's Gypsy WYSIWYG editor, Larry Tesler left Xerox to join Apple in 1980 where he also developed the MacApp framework.

Charles Simonyi left Xerox to join Microsoft in 1981 where he developed first WYSIWYG version of Microsoft Word (3.0). In 1983, Simonyi recommended Scott A. McGregor, who was recruited by Bill Gates to lead the development of Windows 1.0, in part for McGregor's experience in windowing systems at PARC. Later that year, several others left PARC to join Microsoft.

Star, Viewpoint, and GlobalView were the first commercial computing environments to offer support for most natural languages, including full-featured word processing, leading to their adoption by the Voice of America, other United States foreign affairs agencies, and several multinational corporations. The list of products that were inspired or influenced by the user interface of the Star, and to a lesser extent the Alto, include the Lisa, Macintosh, Graphics Environment Manager (GEM), Visi On, Windows, Atari ST, BTRON from TRON project, Amiga, Elixir Desktop, Metaphor Computer Systems, Interleaf, OS/2, SunView, OPEN LOOK, KDE, Ventura Publisher, and NeXTSTEP. Adobe Systems' PostScript was based on Interpress. Ethernet was further refined by 3Com, and has become a de facto standard networking protocol.

Some people said that Apple, Microsoft, and others plagiarized the graphical user interface and other innovations from the Xerox Star, and believe that Xerox didn't properly protect its intellectual property. Many patent disclosures were submitted for the innovations in the Star. However, at the time, the 1975 Xerox Consent Decree, a Federal Trade Commission (FTC) antitrust action, placed restrictions on what the firm was able to patent. Also, when the Star disclosures were being prepared, the Xerox patent attorneys were busy with several other new technologies such as laser printing. Finally, patents on software, particularly those relating to user interfaces, were then an untested legal area.

Xerox went to trial to protect the Star user interface. In 1989, after Apple Computer, Inc. v. Microsoft Corp. for copyright infringement of the Macintosh user interface in Windows, Xerox filed a similar lawsuit against Apple. However, this suit was dismissed on procedural grounds, not substantive, because a three-year statute of limitations had passed. In 1994, Apple lost its suit against Microsoft, not only the issues originally contested, but all claims to the user interface.

On January 15, 2019, a work-in-progress Star emulator created by LCM+L known as Darkstar was released for Windows and Linux.

== See also ==
- Lisp machine
- Pilot (operating system)

| Preceded by Xerox Alto | Xerox Star; 1981–1985 | Succeeded by Xerox Daybreak |
