= XDE =

XDE may refer to:

- XDE, IATA code for Diébougou Airport in Burkina Faso
- Xerox Development Environment (XDE), one of the first integrated development environments
- IBM Rational Rose XDE, an "eXtended Development Environment" (XDE) for software developers
- MainWin XDE, software that allowed Microsoft to produce Internet Explorer for UNIX
