= Alto Trek =

1978 video game

- Developer(s): Gene Ball, Rick Rashid
- Platform(s): Xerox Alto
- Release: 1978
- Genre(s): Space simulation/Real-time strategy/Action
- Mode(s): Multiplayer

Alto Trek is a computer game, developed by Gene Ball and Rick Rashid for the Xerox Alto while they were graduate students at the University of Rochester during the late 1970s. It is one of the first networked multiplayer games.

== Gameplay ==
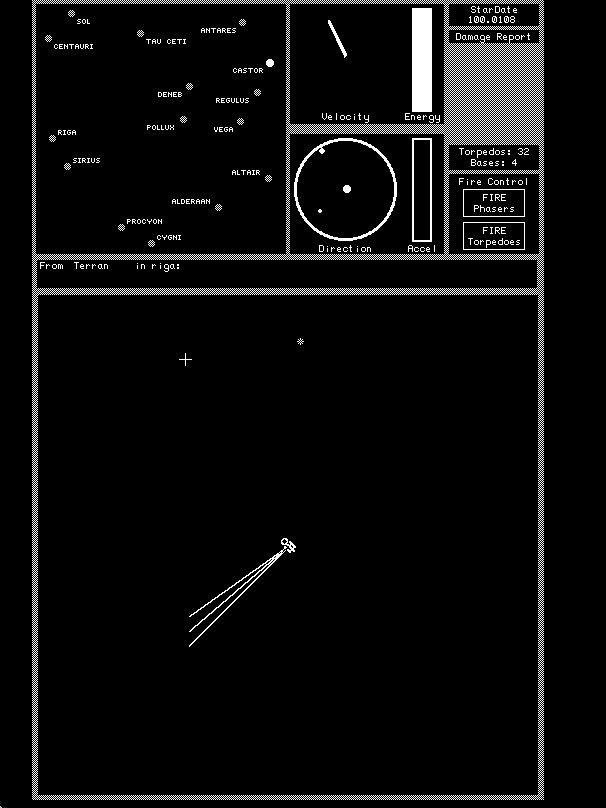
Alto Trek (in the Alto's 606×808 portrait ratio screen)

Alto Trek is a multiplayer game where each player uses their own Alto workstation to control a starship. The objective of the game is to destroy the enemy without being destroyed. A player can choose between being a Klingon, Romulan, or Terran. The game can be played by one player, but there will be no enemy to destroy.

There is no central server that maintains the game state. Each Alto "multicasts" its game information on the shared Ethernet that all players must be on. The "multicast" address on which to rendezvous is a function of the number of stellar systems in the game.

== Development ==
The manual for version 2.1 is dated August 1979 and authored by Allen Wells, Bob Baldwin, and Steve Quarterman. It confirms that the game was authored primarily by Ball.

Around 1997, while a vice president at Microsoft, Rashid began to re-implement the game as a way to teach himself to use the DirectX programming API. This resulted in the development of Microsoft Allegiance.
