= Abbey Silverstone =

American computer executive

- Born: Abbey Silverstone; United States
- Education: University of Illinois (Bachelor of Science)

Abbey Silverstone is an early executive in the computer industry. He co-founded Silicon Graphics (SGI) with Jim Clark, and was its first Vice President of Operations until 1989.

Silverstone has a BS in Industrial Administration from the University of Illinois where, as a student, he worked with the IBM 650 in the registration and grading process. He had an athletic fencing career which included three years as an all-American and a gold medal in the 1958 NCAA championships. He represented Canada at the World fencing championships in 1958, the Pan-American games in 1959 (bronze medal) and the Maccabean games in 1961 (3 bronze medals).

He relocated to California in 1965. In 1973, at Xerox Corp., he worked on the development and production of the first corporate networked office. Xerox Palo Alto Research Center (PARC) developed a network, including some of the first personal computers (Alto), the first high speed monochrome laser printers, the first color laser printer, and the first Ethernet-based corporate-wide electronic network. In 1977, a complete network modeled on the Xerox network was installed in President Jimmy Carter’s White House.

In 1981, Silverstone provided Xerox with the packaging design for the first commercial workstation the Xerox Star 8010. In 1982, Jim Clark, Silverstone, and some graduate students from Stanford University, founded Silicon Graphics. Silverstone managed the Operations Division until 1988 when he began a consulting career.

Silverstone became president and chief executive officer of Netsol Technologies in 1999. In 2000, he became CEO of Multacom, a trans-pacific telecommunications company which connected Mainland China, the United States, and Taiwan.

He has served on several boards in the USA and China. He is now a semi-retired advisor to newly formed companies.
