= Larry Tesler =

American computer scientist (1945–2020)

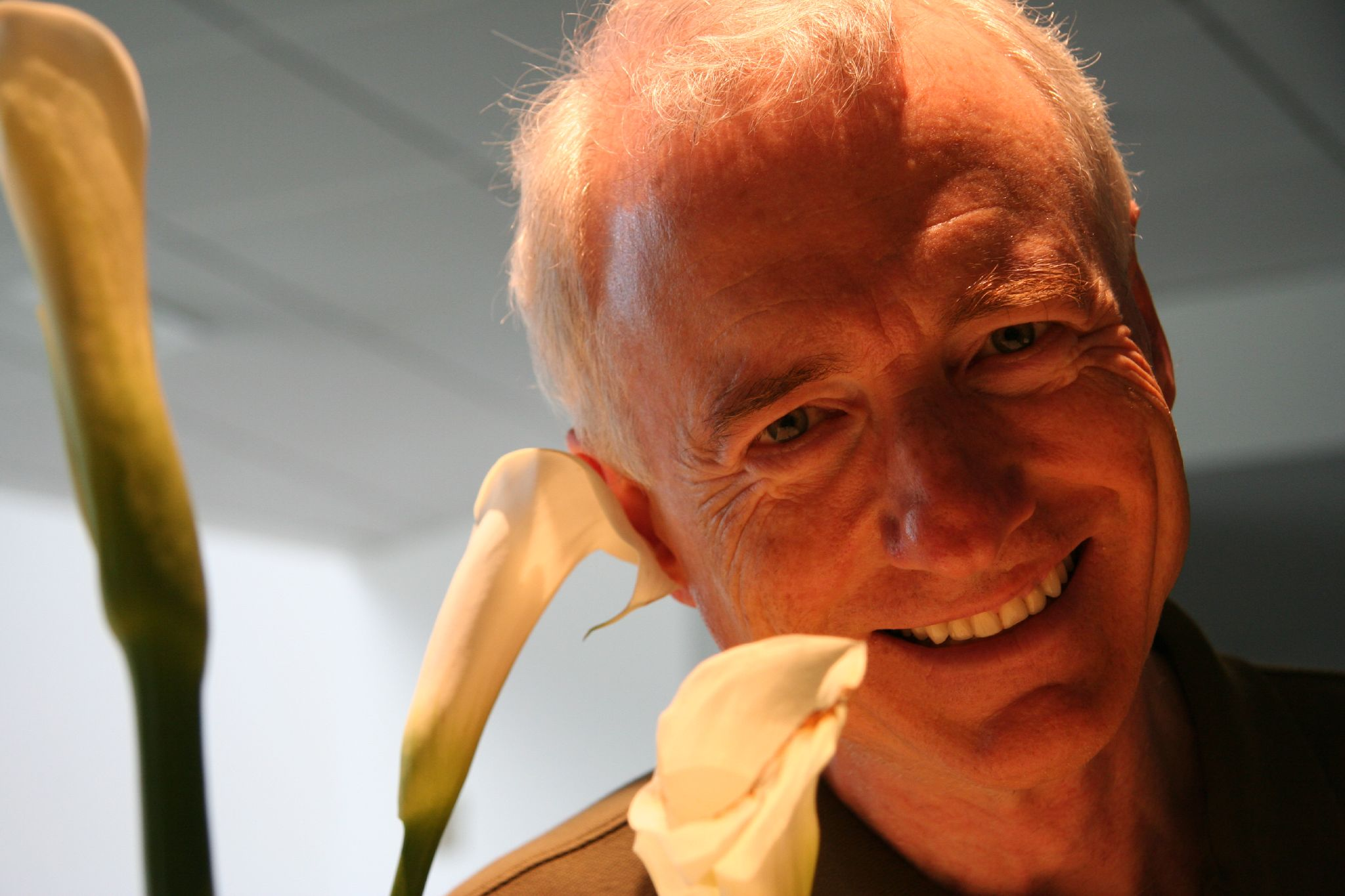
- Tesler in 2007
- Born: Lawrence Gordon Tesler; April 24, 1945; The Bronx, New York City, U.S.
- Died: February 16, 2020 (aged 74); Portola Valley, California, U.S.
- Education: Stanford University
- Known for: Cut, copy, and paste
- Spouses: Shelagh Leuterio (m. 1964; div. 1969) Colleen Barton (m. 1970)
- Children: 1
- Scientific career
- Fields: Human–computer interaction
- Workplaces: Xerox PARC, Apple, Amazon, and Yahoo!

Lawrence Gordon Tesler (April 24, 1945 – February 16, 2020) was an American computer scientist who worked in the field of human–computer interaction. Tesler worked at Xerox PARC, Apple, Amazon, and Yahoo!.

While at PARC, Tesler's work included Smalltalk, the first dynamic object-oriented programming language, and Gypsy, the first word processor with a graphical user interface (GUI) for the Xerox Alto. During this, along with colleague Tim Mott, Tesler developed the idea of cut, copy, and paste functionality and the idea of modeless software. While at Apple, Tesler worked on the Apple Lisa and the Apple Newton, and helped to develop Object Pascal and its use in application programming toolkits including MacApp.

== Biography ==
=== Early career ===
Tesler was born on April 24, 1945, in The Bronx in New York City, to Jewish parents Isidore, an anesthesiologist, and Muriel (née Krechmer). Tesler lived in the Bronx through his childhood and graduated from the Bronx High School of Science in 1961. While in high school, he was guided towards computers by a teacher after showing the teacher an algorithm for generating prime numbers. Through this, he learned of a program at Columbia University where he was able to spend a half-hour each week on their computer systems, through which he taught himself programming before college. He went on to Stanford University in 1961 when he was 16, studying computer science and graduating in 1965 with a degree in mathematics. At Stanford, he had spent time as a student programmer for Joshua Lederberg on the LINC platform, and was a colleague of Larry Breed, Charles Brenner, Douglas Hofstadter, Roger Moore, and Bill Strachan.

During college and afterward, Tesler did some programming jobs on the side, and after graduation, worked as a consultant offering his programming services in the area. As he was one of only a few computer programmers listed in the Palo Alto phone directory he received a good deal of work. However, a regional recession caused this consulting work to dry up. Tesler also worked at Stanford Artificial Intelligence Laboratory (SAIL) in the late 1960s. With Horace Enea he designed Compel, an early single assignment language. This functional programming language was intended to make concurrent processing more natural and was used to introduce programming concepts to beginners.

During his time at Stanford, Tesler had participated in the counterculture of the 1960s, including the anti-Vietnam War protests. In the late 1960s, Tesler became involved in the Midpeninsula Free University, part of the Free Speech Movement, where he taught classes with titles such as "How to end the IBM Monopoly", "Computers Now", and "Procrastination".

=== Xerox PARC ===
Tesler left Stanford Artificial Intelligence Laboratory due to a number of factors in the early 1970s; he recognized that artificial intelligence would not be a usable technology for many years. Tesler is quoted as stating around this time that "AI is whatever hasn't been done yet.", with Douglas Hofstadter calling this Tesler's Theorem. Tesler says that he was misquoted, his actual statement being "Intelligence is whatever machines haven't done yet."

At this time, Tesler's marriage to his college girlfriend had ended in divorce. He took his daughter and moved to Oregon with a number of Vietnam War veterans who were returning there to build homes. There was little computing technology in this area and he could not get a job with the local bank, the only firm nearby with a computer system. He called Stanford to see if they had anything, and learned that Alan Kay, with whom Tesler had worked while at SAIL and then a member of Xerox Palo Alto Research Center (PARC), had been actively looking for him shortly after his departure. Kay wanted Tesler to join him at PARC. Tesler could not be hired at PARC due to a hiring freeze, so Tesler instead took a short-term project offered by Les Earnest from SAIL to write a "document compiler", a means to easily produce printable manuals from simple text files. In order to carry out this project, Tesler wrote Pub, which was then recognized as one of the first uses of markup language; it was later distributed on ARPANet.

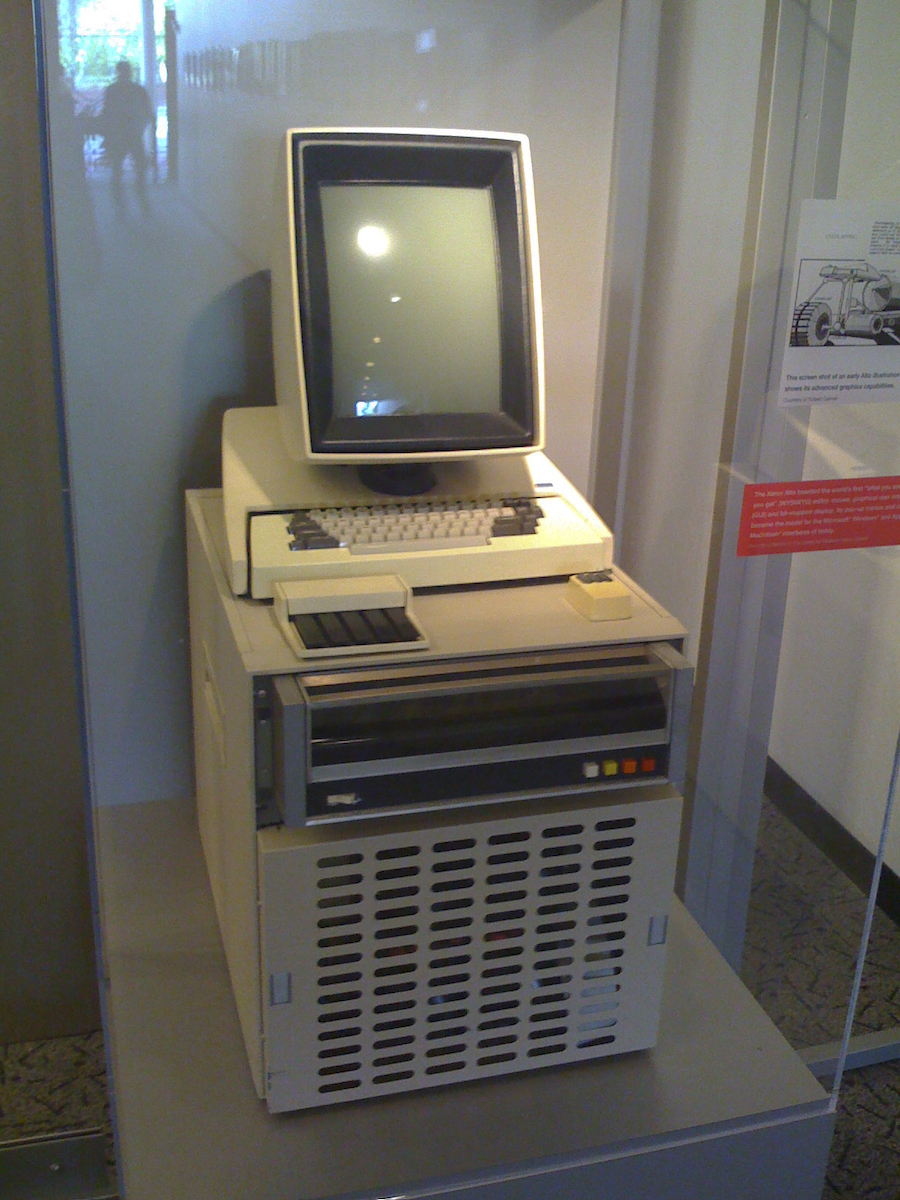
The Xerox Alto computer

PARC approached Tesler with an offer in 1971, but wanted to place Tesler in the On-Line Office System Group. Tesler had been more interested in Xerox's work with personal computers, so he turned down the offer. By early 1973, PARC had established development of the Xerox Alto, the first computer system designed around a graphical user interface (GUI), and Tesler accepted an offer for a position splitting his time between the Office System Group and the Learning Research Group, which Kay was heading. Some of Tesler's main projects at PARC were the Gypsy word processor for the Office System Group, and Smalltalk, the first dynamic object-oriented programming language, with the Learning Research Group. While working on Gypsy, Tesler and his colleague Tim Mott started writing ideas down envisioning the future of interactive computer use, considering current text-based user interfaces would move to GUIs with icons representing documents, and to develop ease-of-use. From there, the two developed the basic copy and paste function, now a standard feature in computing. Tesler also established the idea that computer interfaces should be modeless, where all actions are available to a user at all times, rather than modal, requiring the user to enter a specific mode to perform them. Gypsy was programmed to include both of these concepts.

Tesler also was part of a team with Adele Goldberg and Douglas Fairbairn that worked on the Xerox NoteTaker, a portable computer system Alan Kay had envisioned. Tesler, then a novice to hardware programming and design, worked with Fairbairn on the design, which included the first functioning Ethernet protocol written in software rather than on hardware. Tesler and Fairbairn took the 16 kilograms (35 lb) NoteTaker prototype on cross-country trips to demonstrate the unit to Xerox executives. At one layover during the trip, Tesler and Fairbairn briefly tested the unit at an airport and while in flight, which Tesler believed was the first-ever use of a computer in these situations. The NoteTaker did not gain traction, as Xerox had turned its attention back to the Xerox Alto.

Tesler was a proponent of ease-of-use for user interfaces while at PARC. Tesler is considered the originator of the phrase "user-friendly" as a measure of usability after a salesman told him that word processors were difficult to sell because they were "just so unfriendly". Tesler is also tied to the origins of the phrase "what you see is what you get"; he and his colleagues were complaining about the way documents printed out differently to their appearance on the screen. Tesler said, "What you see on the screen should be what you get when you print it." Another person simplified this to the well-known abbreviation "WYSIWYG" which gained traction as a functional goal within PARC and beyond. Tesler also is credited with coining the term "browser" after creating a Smalltalk code browser in response to a coworker having difficulty in parsing through someone else's code.

Tesler had been present during both of Steve Jobs's fateful visits to PARC in late 1979, a couple of years after Jobs had cofounded Apple Computer. During the first visit, Tesler demonstrated to Jobs the Xerox Alto, including its computer mouse-driven GUI features, Gypsy, and Smalltalk. While the Alto had been a mere curiosity for Xerox, Jobs saw a huge amount of potential in the graphical interface, and immediately after returning to Apple's headquarters, set his team on creating a similar graphical user interface for their first product, the Apple Lisa, incorporating additional information provided by Xerox, later refined into the first Apple Macintosh. However, while the Macintosh was Apple's flagship to becoming a major manufacturer of personal computers, Xerox fell behind.

=== Apple Computer ===
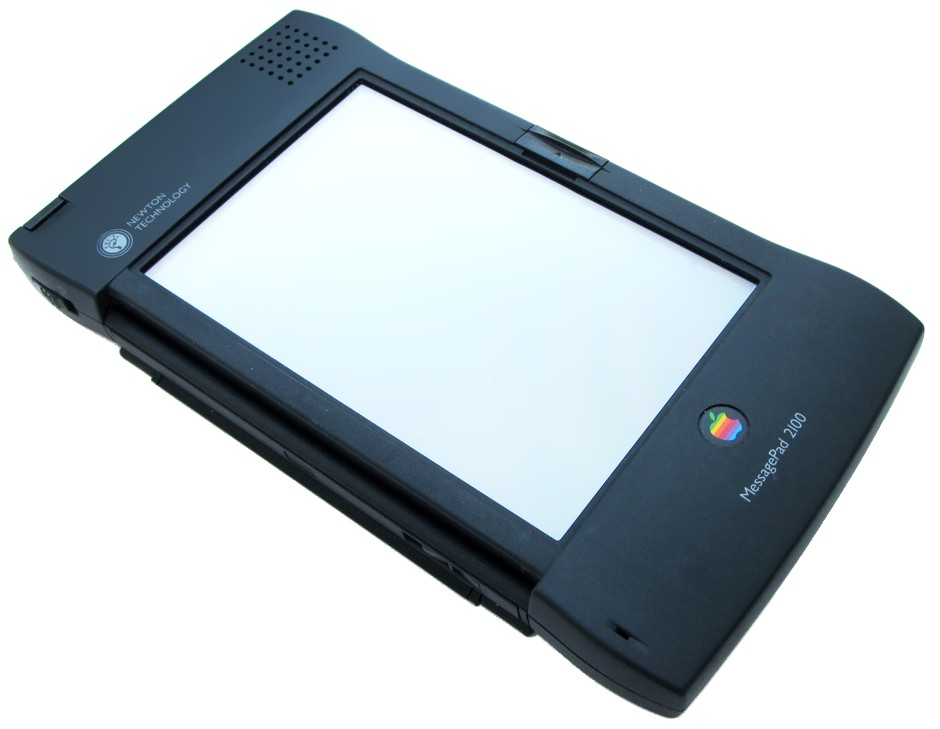
The Apple Newton, released in 1993

Tesler was one of several Xerox PARC employees who left the company in 1980 to join Apple Computer following Jobs's visits. Tesler said his reasons for leaving included the fact that Apple had clearly gotten the idea of computers and was much more excited in the work PARC was doing while Xerox still thought itself a copier company, and that he found Apple's management much more approachable than Xerox's. Tesler started at Apple in July 1980 supporting the development of the Apple Lisa, and worked for them until 1997, holding various positions, including Vice President of AppleNet, the division within Apple working on Internet technologies (not to be confused with AppleNet, the never-shipped network for the Lisa), Vice President of the Advanced Technology Group, and Chief Scientist.

Part of Tesler's work with the Lisa was to develop object-oriented programming extensions to the Pascal programming language allowing easier manipulation of the GUI. Tesler worked with Pascal's creator, Niklaus Wirth, to develop Object Pascal in 1985 which was used to create the Lisa Toolkit. When Apple moved onto the Macintosh platform, the same concepts were brought forward to create MacApp, a similar Object Pascal-based class library for the Macintosh's GUI functions released in 1985.

Starting in 1990, Tesler was named vice president of Apple's Newton Group under the Advanced Technology Group, and led the efforts of developing the Apple Newton, one of the first personal digital assistants and predecessor of the tablet computer. However, Tesler claimed some decisions related to the Newton's release, such as deciding against an Apple-developed handwriting recognition software, over a third-party which slowed down the device, were estimated to have cost Apple millions of dollars. Tesler voluntarily left the group just before the Newton shipped in 1993 and became Apple's chief scientist within the Advanced Technology Group. He explored a number of potential projects being developed by the group, but these had been too risky for Apple at the time, so the group focused on networking strategies. Tesler decided to leave Apple in 1997. One of his last acts was to close the Advanced Technology Group as Apple was struggling too much financially to support such a research program at that time.

In 1991, Tesler contributed the article "Networked Computing in the 1990s" to the Scientific American Special Issue on Communications, Computers, and Networks of September 1991.

=== Later career ===
One of the last programs that Tesler oversaw at Apple was a programming language aimed for use by schoolchildren, named Cocoa (unrelated to the Cocoa application programming interface later released by Apple). With Apple's permission, Tesler spun out and cofounded Stagecast Software in Palo Alto in 1997, where his small team further developed Stagecast Creator, a programming environment aimed for educational uses that had been under development at Apple. Stagecast Creator was released in 1999, just at the time that the education market had turned financially downhill, and sales of the program were not sufficient to keep the company in business. Tesler dismissed most of the employees in mid-2000, and then left, leaving two employees to continue the company.

Tesler joined Amazon in Seattle in October 2001. Initially he had been hired as a vice president of engineering, and was shortly thereafter promoted to the vice president of shopping experience, where he helped to improve the Amazon website interface, including developing its book preview program. While Tesler enjoyed the job at Amazon, his wife had remained in Silicon Valley, and he also felt distant from venture capitalists that were plentiful in Silicon Valley, and opted to leave Amazon. Tesler moved back to Silicon Valley in 2005 to join Yahoo! as vice president of their User Experience and Design group. After three years, he found that Yahoo! had too many competing product lines and a lack of focus, and left in 2008. He worked for a year at the personal genetics information company 23andMe as product fellow, before establishing himself as an independent consultant in December 2009 to help Silicon Valley companies with designing their user interfaces and experiences.

== Personal life ==
After his first marriage ended in divorce in 1969, Tesler married Colleen Barton, a geophysicist.

Tesler had kept his countercultural attitudes beyond his early career, which he became known for at his other positions. He also maintained an attitude that being successful in Silicon Valley was a "rite of passage", and those who succeed should try to help fund new ventures and to educate others. The Computer History Museum, on Tesler's death, described him as having "combined computer science training with a counterculture vision that computers should be for everyone".

Tesler maintained his strong preference for modeless software well beyond his time at PARC. To promote his preference, as of 1995, Tesler equipped his automobile with a personalized California license plate reading "NOMODES". Along with others, he had also been using the phrase "Don't Mode Me In" for years, as a rallying cry to eliminate or reduce usage of modes. His personal website was located at nomodes.com (maintained by his family now for historical reference), and on Twitter he had used the handle "@nomodes".

Tesler died in Portola Valley, California, on February 16, 2020, at the age of 74.

== See also ==
- AI effect
- List of programmers
- List of computer scientists
- Law of conservation of complexity

== Sources ==
- Hofstadter, Douglas (1980), Gödel, Escher, Bach: an Eternal Golden Braid, Penguin Books, ISBN 0-14-005579-7
