= Law of conservation of complexity =

Adage in human-computer interaction

The law of conservation of complexity, also known as Tesler's Law, or Waterbed Theory, is an adage in human–computer interaction stating that every application has an inherent amount of complexity that cannot be removed or hidden. Instead, it must be dealt with, either in product development or in user interaction.

This poses the question of who should be exposed to the complexity. For example, should a software developer add complexity to the software code to make the interaction simpler for the user or should the user deal with a complex interface so that the software code can be simple?

== Background ==
While working for Xerox PARC in the mid-1980s, Larry Tesler realized that the way users interact with applications was just as important as the application itself. The book Designing for Interaction by Dan Saffer includes an interview with Larry Tesler that describes the law of conservation of complexity. The interview is popular among user experience and interaction designers.

Larry Tesler argues that onus for handling complexity should be on the programmer, not the user:

If a million users each waste a minute a day dealing with complexity that an engineer could have eliminated in a week by making the software a little more complex, you are penalizing the user to make the engineer's job easier.

However, Bruce Tognazzini proposes that people resist reductions to the amount of complexity in their lives. Thus, when an application is simplified, users begin attempting more complex tasks.
