= Allegiance (video game) =

Free and open-source multiplayer online game

- Developer: Microsoft Research
- Publisher: Microsoft
- Designer: Rick Rashid
- Platform: Microsoft Windows
- Release: NA: March 31, 2000; EU: April 28, 2000
- Genres: Space simulation, real-time strategy, action
- Mode: Multiplayer

Allegiance is a multiplayer online game initially developed by Microsoft Research. It is notable for providing a mix of real-time strategy and player piloted space combat gameplay.

Although the game was well received upon release, it sold fewer than 29,000 copies in its first year. Microsoft later released it under a proprietary shared source license in 2004 and is maintained and developed by volunteers. In 2017, the license was changed to the free MIT license.

== Gameplay ==
Allegiance is an online multiplayer real time strategy/space simulation game. Players pilot spacecraft (from small one-man vessels to large capital ships), flying in a team with other players and trying to gain victory through various means, such as destroying or capturing all enemy bases, or eliminating the enemy's will to fight. Teams are led by a single Commander who makes tactical decisions and invests in technology and bases. Flight and combat is done in either a first or third person view in a 3D environment, with a real-time, top-down "Command View" of the player's immediate surroundings also available.

Flying a ship is unlike other space sims as Allegiance uses a linear drag flight model, where the absolute speeds are limited, but ship inertia still plays an important role in maneuver considerations.

=== Game objective ===
Gameplay involves expanding from one's starting Garrison in order to secure mining areas, and then either destroying enemy bases or destroying his capacity to fight (through economic warfare), much like a conventional Real time strategy game. However, due to Allegiance's combination of RTS and space sim elements, some reviewers classify Allegiance in a genre of its own. Like an RTS, there is a commander who builds bases and miners, controls the team's cash and develops the team's plan for victory. On the other hand, individual units are controlled by other human players instead of a computer AI which faithfully carries out the commander's orders.

All teams start (by default) with a single Garrison base, a single miner, a set amount of cash and access to a couple of starting ships. One of those starting ships is always the scout. One of the most important ships in Allegiance, the scout is responsible for finding all of a map's sectors and alephs at the beginning of the game. It is also capable of repairing friendly ships under attack, deploying probes to detect enemy movements, deploying minefields which destroy or delay enemy ships, and assisting more powerful ships by spotting enemy targets.

==== The three stages of a conquest game ====
A conquest game splits into three phases, the transitions between these stages are smooth.

- opening - players will explore the map to plan further tactics. At the same moment the first base constructors will launch and move into the newly discovered sectors. Losing one of the constructors or a miner in this stage can change the outcome of the whole game, so both teams try to defend and/or attack the enemy ones.
- mid game - at this point the first bases were built and teams economy are more vulnerable than in the beginning. Also the first technology will be researched, so the teams have access to more powerful ships. The goal of this stage is to get money, hurt the enemy economy and claim sectors. Some teams will research technology to kill bases, others just focus on combat ships.
- end game - one or both teams collected enough money to research advanced technology. Teams will try to destroy or capture the enemy technology bases with their superior technology. Sometimes one teams is unable to destroy or capture the others team last base, so it can end up in a drawn-out battle. These games are over if the team manages to coordinate their attacks or if they have enough money to spam last enemy sectors with bases and/or capital ships. The game is over if one team loses all its technology bases, one team resigns or both teams draw the game.

=== Economy ===
Teams earn money in Allegiance through the use of miners, drone craft which harvest Helium-3 from special asteroids. As miners are a team's principal source of income, commanders frequently buy as many miners as possible, and gameplay frequently revolves around defending friendly miners and destroying enemy ones.

When the funds are available, Commanders can build new bases by purchasing a constructor drone. Once the constructor is ready, the commander orders it to a specific asteroid in a specific sector. It travels from sector to sector using Alephs, wormhole like structures floating in space. Once it arrives at the target sector, it travels to the designated asteroid and builds the base. Constructors are vulnerable until the base is built, so teams frequently focus on protecting their constructors and destroying hostile ones. The bases created by constructors range from simple outposts, used for offensive strikes and territory control, to advanced Technology Bases which allow development of new ships, weapons, and upgrades.

=== Tech paths ===
There are three principle technology paths in Allegiance, each relying on a specialized base. The Tactical path allows the team to fly stealth fighters, which excel at destroying drones such as miners and constructors. The Expansion path creates interceptors: tough, maneuverable craft specializing in defense and short-range dogfights. With a Supremacy Center, the commander can research fighters: versatile ships capable of teleporting to special bases around the map.

Most games in Allegiance end with the destruction or capture of all one team's major bases, and each techpath has tools to accomplish that goal. Both the Supremacy and Tactical techpath rely on some variation of the Bomber, a base destroying ship originally researched at the team's Garrison. The Expansion techpath uses a special Heavy Troop Transport which captures bases. Additionally, teams can build a special Shipyard base, capable of producing expensive, base-destroying capital ships or capital ships with advanced missile systems that can destroy enemy fighters from long ranges.

A typical game lasts between thirty and forty-five minutes, although games of more than two hours in length are not uncommon.

Allegiance has a reputation for not being an easy game to learn, even with its simplified flight model. It has a complex control scheme and a heavy focus on teamwork, tactics and player co-ordination.

== Plot ==
=== Setting ===
The story in which the game is set takes place circa 2150, shortly after the destruction of Earth by an asteroid. This cataclysm forced the remnants of humanity to the stars in search of new land and resources. Humanity quickly fractures into four main factions:

- GigaCorp, a transplanetary corporation bent on controlling all natural resources.
- The militaristic Iron Coalition, descendants of a United Nations-sanctioned peacekeeping force.
- Belters, a motley collection of traders, freedom fighters and pirates.
- The Bios, a mysterious offshoot of genetically engineered humans with their own agenda for "stalegenes".

In the midst of the ensuing civil war, humans discover the alien Rixian Unity. An ancient and advanced race, the Rixians seek to "enlighten" heathen races (such as the human race) and convert them to their religion.

=== Story ===
In 2008 Emmet Longstreet founded GigaCorp, allegedly through a series of shady dealings involving the consolidation of many powerful aerospace companies (as well as other technical industries). Their aim was to colonize and exploit the resources of near-Earth space. 25 years later, a subsidiary of GigaCorp begins genetically engineering humans to be better suited for life in space. Legal restrictions kept the experiments secret, and the resulting group of improved humans became known as BIOS.

During 2057 another GigaCorp project discovers Helium-3 deposits in the asteroid belt. Experiments reveal that He3 would be a highly useful fuel for nuclear fusion. Fierce competition for He3 deposits lead to escalating tensions and political destabilization. In 2071, an He3-related dispute called "The Siege of Leonov" precipitates in United Nations peacekeeping involvement. With a surprise strike, the UN forces end the siege with military action and take over the rich He3 deposits in Leonov Crater. In the wake of this incident, attempts to claim He3 deposits become increasingly violent, leading to a series of minor conflicts involving the UN Coalition forces, independent prospectors and GigaCorp.

In 2074, Gigacorp CEO unveiled the Mass Conveyor system, which transports Helium-3 rich asteroids from the Asteroid Belt to Lunar orbit for capture and mining. This technology is wildly successful, and within two years Gigacorp begins licensing it to other corporations. By 2079, scores of asteroids arrive daily in Lunar orbit, but the lack of a central traffic control system causes problems.

Faster-than-light travel had previously been impossible, but in 2125 the first "Aleph" is discovered by the Crimson Group, a rival of Gigacorp. While their origin is unknown, Alephs are stable wormholes that connect far-flung regions of the galaxy. Soon all of humanity learns of the existence of alephs, which are the sole source of FTL travel in the Allegiance universe. Factions begin vying for control over alephs as fiercely as they battled for control over Helium-3 deposits.

In 2140, a malfunction in the Mass Conveyor system ends with a large asteroid colliding with Earth, cracking the mantle, and killing roughly 95 percent of the Earth's population instantaneously. As the remnants of the Earth's population die in the aftermath, the Solar System plunges into chaos. The four strongest factions rise to seize power over the remnants of humanity. These are the Iron Coalition (UN forces), GigaCorp, the Belter Armada and the BIOS.

The game begins in 2150, with BIOS aggression initiating widespread warfare between the factions.

== History ==
=== Development ===
Initially developed by Microsoft Research, Allegiance was first released for multiplayer on the Microsoft Zone under the name Allegiance Zone. This was a paid subscription service but free play was available on the Free Zone (which had fewer features). The game never achieved commercial success however, selling a mere 29,000 units in the first year of release.

=== End-of-life ===
The official servers closed in 2002. During its brief retail life Allegiance had drawn a dedicated following that continued to play beyond Microsoft's discontinuation of support for Allegiance.

=== Community continuation ===
To allow the player community to maintain Allegiance themselves, on the commercial end-of-life the source-code was released under a shared source license in 2004. It is up-to now maintained and developed by volunteers of the fan-community under the name FreeAllegiance.

In July 2017, Microsoft Research changed the license from MSR shared source license to MIT license, due to the community's initiative to bring Allegiance to Steam.

== Reception ==
Reception

Aggregate score
Aggregator	Score
Metacritic	86%

Review scores
Publication	Score
AllGame	3.5/5
Computer Games Magazine	4.5/5
GameRevolution	3.5/5
GameSpot	8.7/10
GameZone	9/10
IGN	8.2/10
PC Gamer (US)	91%
PC Zone	82%

Award
Publication	Award
GameSpot	Best Game No One Played

Allegiance garnered generally favorable reviews, according to aggregator Metacritic. It claimed GameSpot's award for "Best Game No One Played", as it did not sell as well as Microsoft had hoped. Even with good reviews and a loyal playerbase, the game's steep learning curve made it unattractive to the average gamer.

After Microsoft dropped support for Allegiance, the game has continued to be developed and the game has received additional praise and recognition, but the playerbase has not substantially increased.

Allegiance was a runner-up for the best multiplayer game of 2000 in PC PowerPlay's annual awards, behind Counter-Strike. It was also a finalist for Computer Gaming World's multiplayer game of 2000 award, which went to EverQuest as Allegiance failed to gain traction in the video game market. The game was nominated in the "Massive Multiplayer/Persistent World" category during the 4th Annual Interactive Achievement Awards.
