= GlobalView =

Cross-platform software environment

GlobalView (originally ViewPoint) was an integrated “desktop environment” including word-processing, desktop-publishing, and simple calculation (spreadsheet) and database functionality. It was developed at Xerox PARC as a way to run the software originally developed for their Xerox Alto, Xerox Star and Xerox Daybreak 6085 specialized workstations on Sun Microsystems workstations and IBM PC-based platforms.

== Overview ==
Initially, GlobalView required an additional processor on a PC expansion card; it was late run using emulation. Though the software it was based on had once been far ahead of its time (in terms of its integration and use of a graphical user interface), the high cost of the processor and later low speed of the emulator doomed it to poor sales (almost exclusively old customers of the Alto and Star, recognized as precursors of the Apple Macintosh but in themselves expensive corporate niche machines). The resulting lack of resources for development left it to fall further and further behind its competitors. It existed from the late 1980s until the early 1990s.

== Reception ==
In 1988, Stewart Alsop II cited "two significant problems with ViewPoint". He said that the lack of freedom for third-party software "to develop a separate identity" meant that they would be "invisible" like expansion cards. Alsop believed that ViewPoint had changed little from the original Xerox PARC technology created more than ten years earlier, because (unlike Apple and Microsoft's "hundreds of thousands of users") not enough consumers had used it to give Xerox feedback. He advised the company to "be much less defensive and much more open minded; it needs to stop resting on its laurels."
