= Xerox Daybreak =

Workstation computer (1985–1989)

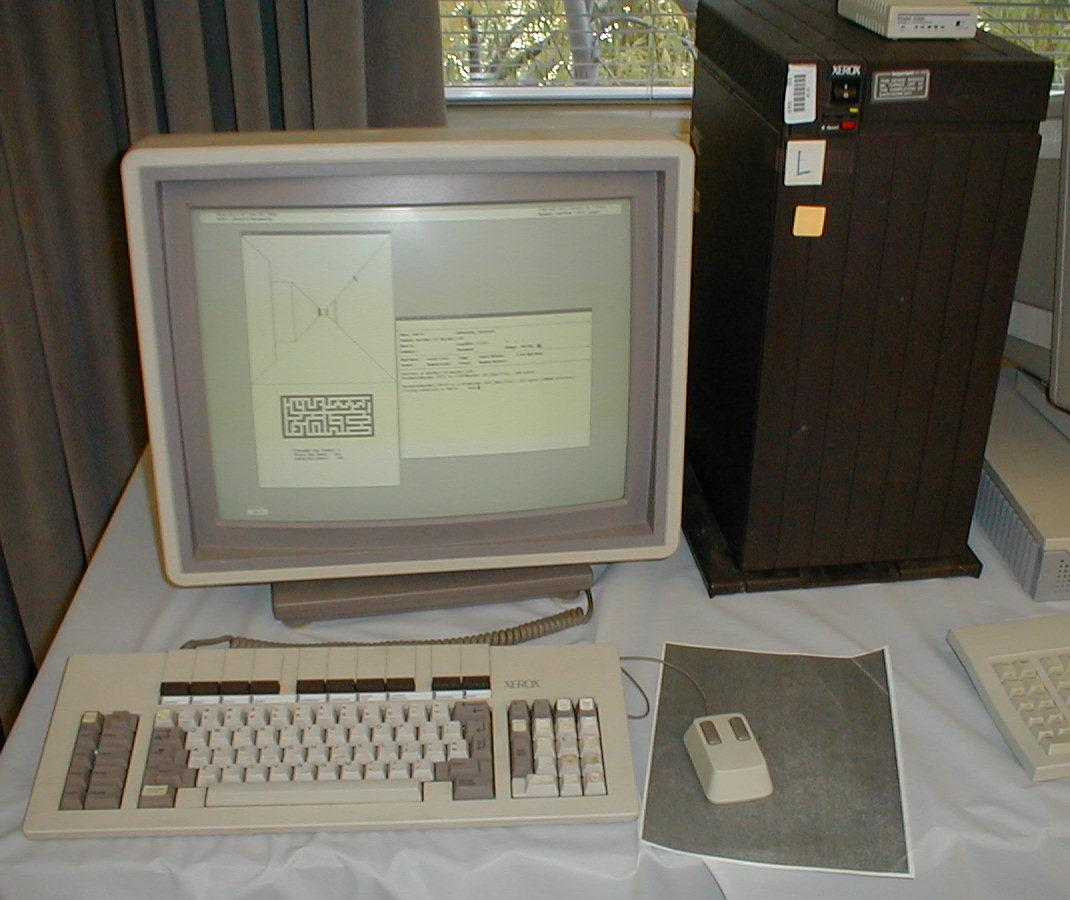
- Xerox 6085
- Also known as: Xerox 6085 PCS, Xerox 1186
- Developer: Xerox
- Manufacturer: Xerox
- Type: Workstation
- Released: 1985; 41 years ago
- Introductory price: US$4,995 (equivalent to $15,000 in 2025)
- Discontinued: 1989
- Operating system: ViewPoint
- CPU: 8 MHz Mesa processor, Intel 80186 auxiliary processors for PC emulation and I/O
- Memory: 1.1 MB, expandable to 3.7 MB; 4 MB for Xerox 6085-2
- Storage: 10, 20, 40, or 80 MB hard drive and 5¼-inch floppy disk drive; additional 100 and 190 MB option for Xerox 6085-2
- Display: 15 or 19 inch (80 pixels per inch) monochrome displays
- Connectivity: Ethernet
- Predecessor: Xerox Star

Xerox Daybreak (also Xerox 6085 PCS, Xerox 1186) is a workstation computer marketed by Xerox from 1985 to 1989.

== Overview ==
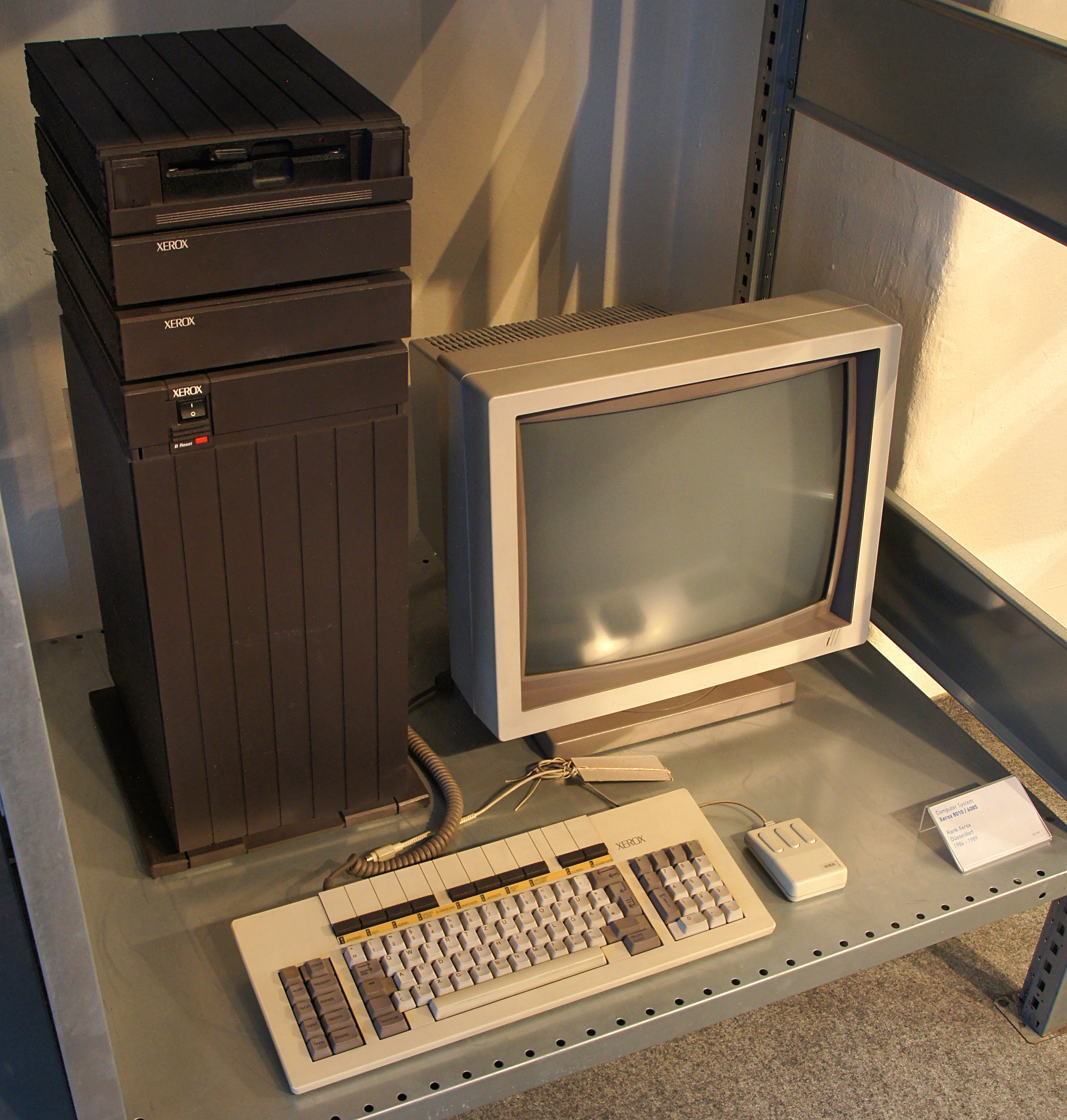
Xerox 8010/6085 Düsseldorf 1984-1989

Daybreak is the final release in the D* (pronounced D-Star) series of machines, some of which share the Wildflower CPU design by Butler Lampson. Machines in this series include, in order, Dolphin, Dorado, Dicentra, Dandelion, Dandetiger, Daybreak, the never-manufactured Daisy, and Dragonfly "a 4-processor VLSI CPU developed at PARC and intended for a high-end printing system".

It was sold as the Xerox 6085 PCS (Professional Computer System) or ViewPoint 6085 PCS when sold as an office workstation running the ViewPoint system. ViewPoint is based on the Star software originally developed for the Xerox Star. The 6085 ran the ViewPoint (later GlobalView) GUI and was used extensively throughout Xerox until being replaced by Sun workstations and PCs. Although years ahead of its time, it was never a commercial success. The proprietary closed architecture and Xerox's reluctance to release the Mesa development environment for general use stifled any third-party development.

A fully configured 6085 came with an 80 MB hard disk, 3.7 MB of RAM, a 5¼-inch floppy disk drive, an Ethernet controller, and a PC emulator card containing an 80186 CPU. The basic system came with 1.1 MB of RAM and a 10 MB hard disk. It was introduced in 1985 at US$4,995 (equivalent to $15,000 in 2025).

The Daybreak was also sold as a Xerox 1186 workstation when configured as a Lisp machine.

Xerox also produced the Xerox Encryption Unit, intended to "sit atop a Xerox 6085 workstation processor" but reportedly usable by workstations and personal computers in general, for the encryption of IEEE 802.3 and Ethernet local area network traffic in government computing environments.
