= WYSIWYG =

Acronym for "what you see is what you get" in computing

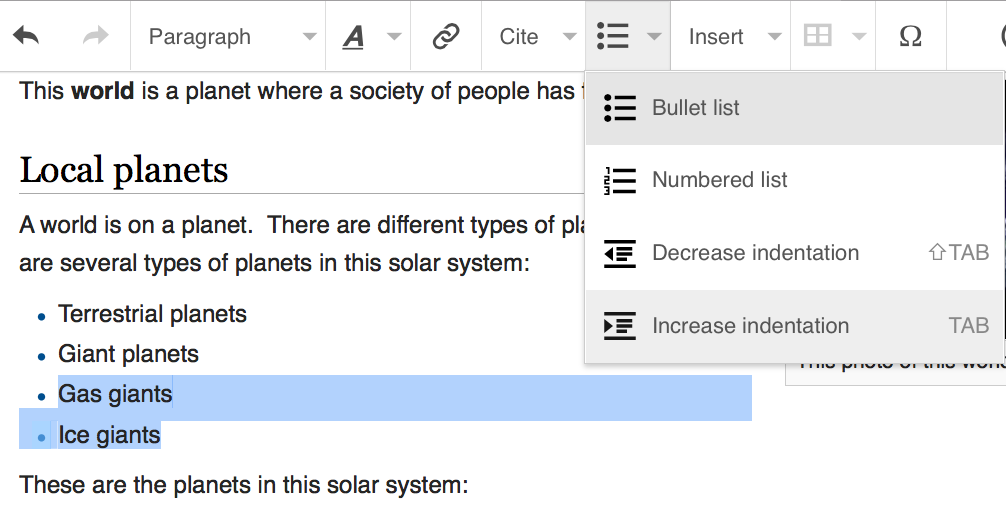
VisualEditor, a WYSIWYG editor, displays pages like they will ultimately be rendered, with dropdowns and buttons instead of having the user type commands

In computing, WYSIWYG (/ˈwɪziwɪɡ/ WIZ-ee-wig; what you see is what you get) is software that allows content to be edited in a form that resembles its appearance when printed or displayed as a finished product, such as a printed document, web page, or slide presentation. WYSIWYG implies a user interface that allows the user to view something very similar to the result while the document is being created. In general, WYSIWYG implies the ability to directly manipulate the layout of a document without having to type or remember names of layout commands.

== History ==
Before the adoption of WYSIWYG techniques, text appeared in editors using the system standard typeface and style with little indication of layout (margins, spacing, etc.). Users enter special non-printing control codes (now referred to as markup code tags) to indicate that some text should be in boldface, italics, or a different typeface or size. In this environment there is very little distinction between text editors and word processors.

These applications typically use an arbitrary markup language to define the codes/tags. Each program has its own special way to format a document, and it was a difficult and time-consuming process to change from one word processor to another. The use of markup tags and codes remains popular today in some applications due to their ability to store complex formatting information. When the tags are made visible in the editor, however, they occupy space in the unformatted text, and as a result can disrupt the desired layout and flow.

Bravo, a document preparation program for the Alto produced at Xerox PARC by Butler Lampson, Charles Simonyi and colleagues in 1974, is generally considered to be the first program to incorporate the WYSIWYG technology, displaying text with formatting (e.g. with justification, fonts, and proportional spacing of characters). The Alto monitor (72 PPI, based on the typographic unit) was designed so that one full page of text could be seen and then printed on the first laser printers. Bravo was released commercially, and the software eventually included in the Xerox Star is a direct descendant of it.

In late 1978, in parallel with but independent of the work at Xerox PARC, Hewlett-Packard developed and released the first commercial WYSIWYG software application for producing overhead slides (or what today are referred to as presentation graphics). The first release, named BRUNO (after an HP sales training puppet), runs on the HP 1000 minicomputer, taking advantage of HP 2640, HP's first bitmapped computer terminal. BRUNO was then ported to the HP-3000 and re-released as HP Draw.

By 1981, MicroPro advertised that its WordStar word processor had WYSIWYG, but its display was limited to displaying styled text in WYSIWYG fashion; bold and italic text was displayed on screen instead of being surrounded by tags or special control characters. In 1983, the Weekly Reader advertised its Stickybear educational software with the slogan "what you see is what you get", with photographs of its Apple II graphics, but home computers of the 1970s and early 1980s lacks the graphics capabilities necessary to display WYSIWYG documents, and such applications are usually confined to limited-purpose, high-end workstations (such as the IBM Displaywriter System) that were too expensive for the general public to afford. As improving technology allowed the production of cheaper bitmapped displays, WYSIWYG software appeared in more popular computers, including LisaWrite for the Apple Lisa, released in 1983, and MacWrite for the Apple Macintosh, released in 1984.

PC Magazine wrote in 1988 that despite "heroic steps" by many companies, IBM PC-based word processors "are still unsatisfying" compared to those on Macintosh. The Macintosh system was originally designed so that the screen resolution and the resolution of the ImageWriter dot-matrix printers sold by Apple is easily scaled: 72 PPI for the screen and 144 DPI for the printers. Thus, the scale and dimensions of the on-screen display in programs such as MacWrite and MacPaint are easily translated to the printed output. If the paper is held up to the screen, the printed image is the same size as the on-screen image, but at twice the resolution. As the ImageWriter was at first the only model of printer physically compatible with the Macintosh printer port, this created an effective closed system. Later, when Macs using external displays became available, the resolution was fixed to the size of the screen to achieve 72 DPI. These resolutions often differed from the VGA-standard resolutions common in the PC world at the time. Thus, while a Macintosh 15-inch (38 cm) monitor has the same 640 × 480 resolution as a PC, a 16-inch (41 cm) screen is fixed at 832 × 624 rather than the 800 × 600 resolution used by PCs. With the introduction of third-party dot-matrix printers as well as laser printers and multisync monitors, resolutions deviate from even multiples of the screen resolution, making true WYSIWYG harder to achieve.

== Etymology ==
The phrase "what you see is what you get", from which the acronym derives, was a catchphrase popularized by Flip Wilson's drag persona Geraldine, first appearing in September 1969, then regularly in the early 1970s on The Flip Wilson Show. The phrase was a statement demanding acceptance of Geraldine's entire personality and appearance.

As it relates to computing, there are multiple claims to first use of the phrase:

- Around 1974, Karen Thacker, the technophobe wife of Xerox hardware designer Charles "Chuck" Thacker, was introduced to a Xerox Alto running Bravo, and commented, "You mean, what I see is what I get?"
- In mid-1975, John W. Seybold, the founder of Seybold Publications, and researchers at PARC incorporated Gypsy software into Bravo to create Bravo 3, which allowed text to be printed as displayed. Charles Simonyi and the other engineers appropriated Flip Wilson's popular phrase around that time.
- Barbara Beeton reports that the term was coined by Bill Tunnicliffe, in a presentation at a 1978 committee meeting involving the Graphic Communications Association (GCA), the American Mathematical Society (AMS), and the Printing Industries of America (PIA).

== Variations ==
Many variations are used only to illustrate a point or make a joke, and have very limited real use. Some that have been proposed include the following:

- WYGIWYG; what you get is what you get, often used in a similar way to WYSIAYG, WYSIMOLWYG, or WYSINWYW.
- WYGIWYS, what you get is what you see, used in computing to describe an interaction paradigm in results-oriented user interface. The term was used by Jakob Nielsen to describe Microsoft Office 2007's "Ribbon" interface
- WYSIAWYG; what you see is almost what you get, similar to WYSIMOLWYG.
- WYSIAYG, what you see is all you get, used to point out that advanced users are sometimes limited by the user interface.
- WYSIMOLWYG, what you see is more or less what you get, recognizing that most WYSIWYG implementations are imperfect.
- WYSINWYW, what you see is not what you want, suggesting that Microsoft Word often controls the user, not the other way around
- WYSIWYW, what you see is what you want, used to describe GNU TeXmacs editing platform. The abbreviation clarifies that unlike in WYSIWYG editors, the user is able to customize WYSIWYW platforms to act (possibly in part) as manual typesetting programs such as TeX or troff.
- WYTIWYG, what you think is what you get, found in Ward Cunningham's Wiki, the first user-editable website, meaning "what we look for is often what we find", in turn meaning that "formatted output actually looks like you expect it to look"
- YAFIYGI, you asked for it you got it, used to describe a text-command-oriented document editing system that does not include WYSIWYG, in reference to the fact that users of such systems often get something they did not really want. It is considered to be the opposite of WYSIWYG. The phrase was first used, without the initials, in this context in 1983 in the essay "Real Programmers Don't Use Pascal", where it described the TECO text editor system. It began to be abbreviated circa 1993.

== See also ==
- Website builder
- HTML editor
- Visual editor
- DWIM
- WYSIWYM
