= Gene Ball =

American computer science researcher

Gene Ball is a computer science researcher and computer programmer.

Ball obtained a bachelor's degree from the University of Oklahoma, and attended graduate school at the University of Rochester, completing a master's degree and finishing his doctorate in 1982. While at Rochester, he met Rick Rashid, and together they created Alto Trek, one of the earlier networked multiplayer computer games.

In 1979, along with Rashid, Ball worked as a researcher Carnegie Mellon University. In 1983, he left academia for two years, spending 1983 and 1984 designing software at Formative Technologies. In 1985, he became an assistant professor at the University of Delaware at Newark.

From 1991 until 2001 he was a researcher at Microsoft, leading the Persona Project, which focused on developing lifelike computer characters that could conversationally interact with users.
