= Xerox Development Environment =

The Xerox Development Environment was one of the first Integrated development environments (IDEs). It was first implemented on the Xerox Alto in 1977.

== See also ==
- BCPL
- Mesa (programming language)
