= Government Information Awareness =

The Government Information Awareness (GIA) project was an initiative of the MIT Media Lab, designed "to provide American citizens with digital tools for participating in the democratic process."

The GIA initiative was inspired by the Total Information Awareness project of the US government's Information Awareness Office, and was predicated on the premise that citizens have a right to maintain information on the government - similar to what information the government maintains on the citizens.

== History ==
The project was announced via a press release on the MIT Media Center website, dated July 2, 2003. The press release affirmed that the project would be "unveiled" on July 4. Wired magazine ran an article covering the project, dated July 4, 2003.

The designer of the site, graduate student Ryan McKinley, developed the site under the direction of Christopher Csikszentmihályi, Fukutake Assistant Professor in the Media Lab's Computer Culture group. McKinley explained the purpose of the site by saying "Democracy requires an informed public," and "Our goal is develop a technology which empowers citizens to form their own intelligence agency; to gather, sort and act on information they gather about the government."

In his review of the project at java.net, Alex Rupp described the project's "Civilian Intelligence Agency" idea of performing espionage on its own government as "a chapter right out a Neal Stephenson novel."

The MIT GIA project has been cited as an influence by officials working on Open Government projects in the United Kingdom.

== Functionality ==
GIA was designed to tap into the Collective Intelligence of the American citizenry, allowing anyone to "submit information, judge credibility and make connections." The database allowed anyone to contribute anonymously, but with a feature to contact the government member in question, to facilitate the opportunity for confirmation or denial.

GIA allowed people to "explore data, track events, find patterns and build profiles related to specific government officials or political issues." Information was readily available on topics from campaign finance and corporate ties, religious affiliation, and educational background, to real-time notifications when a given government official would be appearing on television.

In his Hacking Congress column at xml.com, Paul Ford referred to the GIA initiative as an "attempt to map the government."

== Current status ==
As of December 2013, the website URL for GIA no longer resolves via DNS and the site is unavailable.

== See also ==
- ADVISE
- Carnivore, FBI US digital interception program
- Combat Zones That See, or CTS, a project to link up all security cameras citywide and "track everything that moves".
- Communications Assistance For Law Enforcement Act
- ECHELON, NSA worldwide digital interception program
- Information Processing Technology Office
- Intellipedia, a collection of wikis used by the U.S. intelligence community to "connect the dots" between pieces of intelligence
- MALINTENT—similar program to HumanID
- Mass surveillance
- Multistate Anti-Terrorism Information Exchange
- PRISM
- Sousveillance, undersight, and inverse surveillance
- Synthetic Environment for Analysis and Simulations
- TALON (database)
