= Nasrina Bargzie =

Afghan-American lawyer

Nasrina Bargzie is an Afghan-American lawyer who was the deputy counsel to U.S. vice president Kamala Harris from 2022 to 2024. In the role, she was a policy advisor on Muslim, Arab, and Gaza Strip topics in addition to reproductive rights, voting, and democracy. She joined the Kamala Harris 2024 presidential campaign to lead its outreach to Muslim and Arab communities.

== Life ==
Bargzie was born in Kandahar, Afghanistan. Due to the Soviet–Afghan War, she lived in an active war zone during the first two years of her life. Her father and uncle were prisoners of war before disappearing. Her family lived in Pakistan for three years as refugees. In 1985, she moved to the East Bay, California with her family under the United States Refugee Admissions Program. Bargzie has six sisters and is fluent in Pashto. She earned a J.S. from UC Berkeley School of Law in 2005. She is a member of the Order of the Coif.

Bargzie clerked for judge William A. Fletcher of the United States Court of Appeals for the Ninth Circuit. For several years, she was a lawyer and legal fellow on the national security project of the American Civil Liberties Union. She has worked for Boies Schiller Flexner LLP, and lectured at Stanford Law School. She has worked for Boies Schiller Flexner LLP, and lectured at Stanford Law School.

Bargzie was a national security and civil rights senior staff attorney for Asian Americans Advancing Justice with the Asian Law Caucus. In this role, Bargzie authored a 2015 article arguing that the U.S. government's Suspicious Activity Reporting (SAR) program unfairly labels innocent activities as potential terrorism, disproportionately targeting marginalized communities. She contended that such surveillance practices violate privacy rights and legal standards, and emphasizes the need for accountability and public oversight in how SARs are handled. In a 2015 article published in the UC Law Journal of Race and Economic Justice, Bargzie and Yaman Salahi argued that the U.S. Department of Education should carefully balance protecting students' civil rights while ensuring that First Amendment rights are not infringed upon, particularly in the context of campus speech about Israel and Palestine. They emphasized the need for policies that prevent the chilling effect of federal investigations on free speech and encourages open political dialogue in educational institutions.

In January 2021, Bargzie joined the Office of the Vice President of the United States as the associate counsel to vice president Kamala Harris. She was promoted to deputy counsel to the vice president in May 2022. In these roles, she was a policy advisor on Muslim, Arab, and Gaza Strip topics. She provided input on reproductive rights, voting, and democracy. She left in July 2024.

In August 2024, Bargzie joined the Kamala Harris 2024 presidential campaign to lead its outreach to Muslim and Arab communities.
