= Deep green =

Deep green may refer to:

- Any dark or rich shade of green
- Deep Green, decision-making support system for United States Army commanders
- Deep Green Resistance, a branch of radical environmental theory and its associated movement
- Deep ecology, an ecological and environmental philosophy
- "Deep Green", a song by Big Red Machine from their self-titled album
- Deep Green, an album by Jack Lancaster
