= Counterintelligence Field Activity =

United States counterintelligence agency

Counterintelligence Field Activity (CIFA) was a United States Department of Defense (DoD) agency whose size and budget were classified. The CIFA was created by a directive (Number 5105.67) from the Secretary of Defense, then Donald Rumsfeld, on February 19, 2002. On August 8, 2008, it was announced that CIFA would be shut down. The Defense Intelligence Agency (DIA) absorbed most of the components and authorities of the CIFA into the Defense Counterintelligence and Human Intelligence Center, which was later consolidated into the Defense Clandestine Service.

== Mission ==
CIFA goals were:

- To effectively and efficiently manage and oversee the Defense Department counterintelligence enterprise.
- To synchronize Defense counterintelligence activities across the department, in coordination with the national intelligence community.
- To manage priority counterintelligence plans and projects in fulfillment of national, department and combatant commander requirements.
- To select and develop unique counterintelligence operational support capabilities and make them available to the wider intelligence community.
- To serve as the primary source of career development and training for counterintelligence professionals.
- To identify, develop and field advanced technologies for counterintelligence.
- To create a joint, interoperable and synchronized approach to counterintelligence as a distinct intelligence discipline.
- To assess the feasibility of a department-level joint operational element for Defense counterintelligence.

== Organization ==
The Director of DoD CIFA reported directly to DoD's Undersecretary of Defense for Intelligence.

The offices of Chief of Staff, Office of General Counsel, and Office of the Inspector General reported directly to the Director of CIFA.

CIFA was then broken into four directorates: Program Management, Information Technology, Operational Support and Training and Development.

Program Management was responsible for budgeting, management and accountability.

Information Technology was responsible for planning and managing special technology needs of the counterintelligence enterprise.

Operational Support planned, directed and managed counterintelligence activities and coordinated offensive counterintelligence campaigns.

Training and Development set performance assessment standards and assured that defense counterintelligence training and education programs, as well as instructors, maintained accreditation and certification.

== Joint Protection Enterprise Network (JPEN) database ==
CIFA managed the database of "suspicious incidents" in the United States or the Joint Protection Enterprise Network (JPEN). It was an intelligence and law enforcement system that was a near real-time sharing of raw non-validated information among DoD organizations and installations. Feeding into JPEN were intelligence, law enforcement, counterintelligence, and security reports, information from DoD's "Threat and Local Observation Notice" (TALON) reporting system of unfiltered information, and other reports.

There were seven criteria taken into account in the creation of a TALON report:

- Nonspecific threats
- Surveillance
- Elicitation
- Tests of security
- Repetitive activities
- Bomb threats
- Suspicious activities and/or incidents

Army regulation 190-45, Law Enforcement Reporting, stated that JPEN may be used to share police intelligence with DOD law enforcement agencies, military police, the U.S. Army Criminal Investigation Command and local, state, federal, and international law enforcement agencies.

== Privacy issues ==
The domestic collection of data by military agencies was strictly regulated by laws such as the Privacy Act of 1974, which strengthened and specified a United States citizen's right to privacy as noted in the Fourth Amendment United States Constitution. In addition, the Supreme Court of the United States found in Griswold v. Connecticut (1965) the right to privacy against government intrusion was protected by the "penumbras" of other Constitutional provisions. The DoD reflected these in its own guidelines that have been in place since 1982.

CIFA's similar collection and retention of data on peace groups and other activists promoted parallels to be drawn between the two programs by civil rights groups like the ACLU, and intelligence officials who found the prospect of the military tracking peace groups again to be worrisome.

After ACLU filed multiple Freedom of Information Act (FOIA) requests regarding information gathering on peace groups and NBC did a report citing a Quaker group planning an anti-enlistment action that was listed as a "threat", a review of CIFA activities was ordered by then Undersecretary of Defense for Intelligence Stephen A. Cambone, who stated at the time that it appeared that there had been several violations.

A complaint requesting the expedition of the FOIA requests by the ACLU was ruled in their favor by a federal court. The released documents showed that at least 126 peace groups' information had been held past required removal dates. The DoD has since stated that it removed all improperly kept data.

== Shut down ==
On April 1, 2008, the Pentagon's top intelligence official (James R. Clapper, the Under Secretary of Defense (Intelligence)) recommended CIFA's dismantling.

On August 8, 2008, it was announced that CIFA would be shut down and its activities would be absorbed by the Defense Intelligence Agency.

== See also ==
- Authorization for Use of Military Force Against Terrorists (2001)
- Authorization for Use of Military Force Against Iraq Resolution of 2002
- USA PATRIOT Act, specifically USA PATRIOT Act, Title II entitled Enhanced Surveillance Procedures
- Fourth Amendment to the United States Constitution
- Economic Espionage Act of 1996
- Privacy Act of 1974
- Counter-terrorism

== General and cited references ==
- DoD Directive Number 5105.67
- The Privacy Act Of 1974 - 5 U.S.C. § 552a As Amended
- Office of the Secretary of Defense
- Counterintelligence to the Edge
- Military Police bulletin, April 2006
- Pentagon admits errors in spying on protesters
- Pentagon Expanding Its Domestic Surveillance Activity
