= Combat Zones That See =

DARPA Project

Combat Zones That See, or CTS, was a 2003 Defense Advanced Research Projects Agency (DARPA) research solicitation for developing multi-camera video analysis systems for military operations in urban terrain. The program focused on using large numbers of cameras and automatic video understanding to track vehicle movement over city-sized distances.

== Objective and technical approach ==
CTS is described by DARPA as intended for use in combat zones, to deter enemy attacks on United States troops and to identify and track enemy combatants who launch attacks against U.S. soldiers. The computer software is intended to be able to identify vehicles by color, shape, size, license plate, or driver and passengers face.

== Program structure and testing ==
The program was planned around two configurations. An initial force Protection configuration to be developed and tested at Fort Belvoir, Virginia, and a later military operations in urban terrain configuration intended for mobile forces in urban combat settings. DARPA anticipated one integrated contractor team and funding of up to $4 million per year for three years. The first phase used at least 30 cameras, while the second phase used at least 100. Both prototypes are designed to accommodate thousands of cameras.

== Legal scope and privacy concerns ==
Civil liberties activists and writers of dystopian fiction believe that such programs have great potential for privacy violations, and have openly opposed the project. Jan Walker, a spokeswoman from DARPA said that the CTS technology was not intended to be used for homeland security or law enforcement. Privacy experts and scientists nevertheless raised concerns that similar technology could be adapted for civilian surveillance.

== See also ==
- Closed-circuit television
- Cognitive Technology Threat Warning System
- Heterogenous Aerial Reconnaissance Team
- Information Awareness Office
- Surveillance
- VIRAT
