= Deep Green =

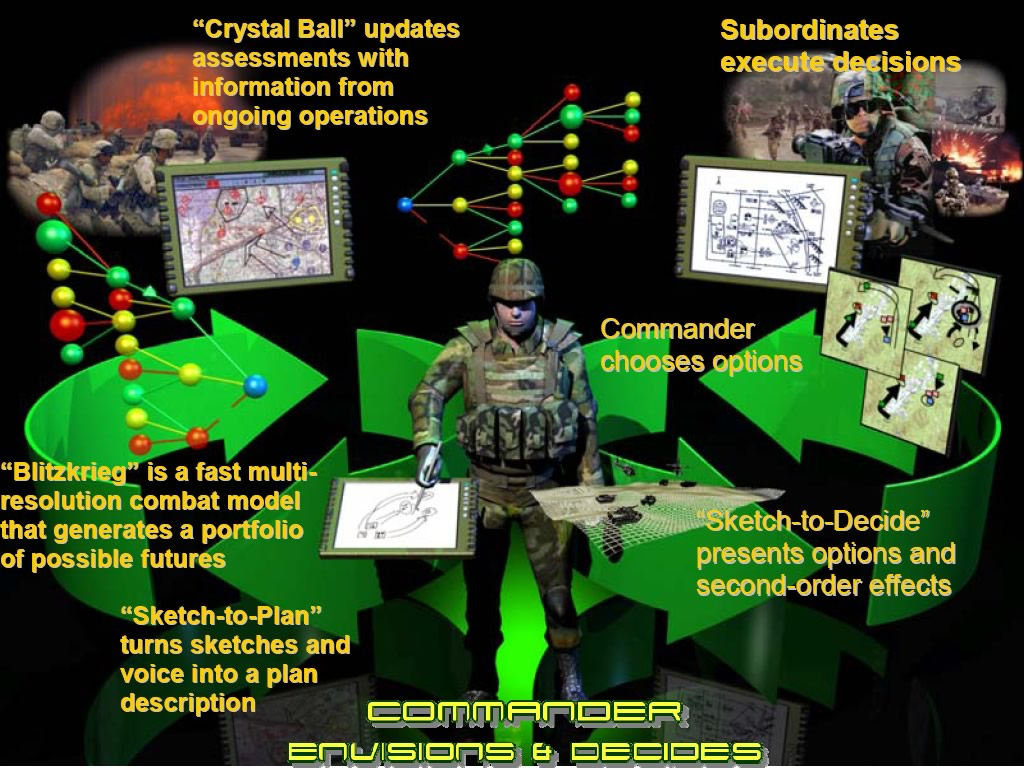
Schematic diagram describing purpose of Deep Green (From official DARPA presentation)

Deep Green is a project that ran under the Information Processing Technology Office of the Defense Advanced Research Projects Agency. The purpose of the project was to develop a decision-making support system for United States Army commanders. The systems developed feature advanced predictive capabilities to enable computers to efficiently and accurately predict possible future scenarios, based on an analysis of the current situation, in order to give army commanders a better view of possible outcomes for their decisions

Deep Green is composed of four major components:

- Blitzkrieg – Battlefield model which analyzes current situation and determines possible future outcomes for use in planning. When a plan is presented, Blitzkrieg analyzes the plan to point out possible results of that course of action to the commander. Blitzkrieg itself does not do planning, it merely determines the likely results of a plan formulated by a human commander.
- Crystal Ball – Performs analysis of possible futures generated from blitzkrieg, and determines the "best" choices by measuring flexibility, usefulness, and likelihood of each. It picks the best of these choices and presents them to the commander. Also updates model of battlefield situation with information pulled from the field. This might include reports from soldiers, through a program similar to the Communicator program that was developed under the Information Awareness Office or through automated RSTA systems such as HART.
- Commander's Associate – this is the user interface and visualization component. It consists of "Sketch-to-decide" which presents the commander with a list of options, and "Sketch-to-plan" which is a screen on which the commander can draw up a plan, which Deep Green will interpret and put into action.

== See also ==
- Heterogeneous Aerial Reconnaissance Team – a RSTA program of the sort that will feed battlespace situational data to "Crystal Ball"
- Information Awareness Office – which developed similar systems, such as Genoa & Genoa II
