= Suspicious Activity Report (justice and homeland security) =

A suspicious activity report is a report of suspicious activity that may either be a terrorist act, a criminal act, or a non-criminal act considered a precursor to either a terrorist act or criminal act. A SAR may be filed by law enforcement, public safety personnel, owners of critical infrastructure or the general public. The report is the incident level event reported under the National SAR Initiative, a joint project of the United States Department of Justice and the United States Department of Homeland Security. It is run by the SAR Program Office in the Department of Justice. SARs are completed at the local, state or federal law enforcement level and shared with fusion centers who make the information available to local law enforcement agencies, United States Department of Justice and the United States Department of Homeland Security the FBI, the Department of Defense and private partners. Fusion centers have been criticized by a U.S. Senate Committee which found that the fusion centers often produced "irrelevant, useless or inappropriate intelligence reporting".

== See also ==
- Suspicious Activity Report (SAR)
- TrapWire

== Notes ==
- National SAR Initiative Website
