= Heterogeneous Aerial Reconnaissance Team =

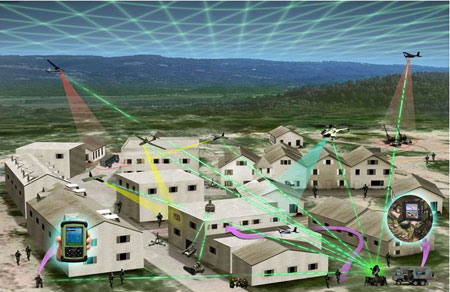
HART program concept drawing from official IPTO (DARPA) website

The Heterogeneous Aerial Reconnaissance Team (HART)—formerly known as the "Heterogeneous Urban RSTA Team (HURT)"—program was an aerial surveillance project funded by the Information Processing Technology Office (which was merged into the Information Innovation Office) of the Defense Advanced Research Projects Agency with program managers John Bay and Michael Pagels. The purpose of the program was to develop systems that could provide continuous, real-time, three-dimensional surveillance of large urbanized areas, using unmanned aerial vehicles. The project team was led by Northrop Grumman Corporation, and involved several other academic and corporate researchers.

The unique features of the HART program are that it developed systems to "decouple soldiers from flight control"—that is, the UAVs automatically pilot themselves—taking care of flight control, collision prevention, and camera/sensor control automatically. When the drones notice suspicious activity, they notify the person with the HART control panel so that they can monitor the situation. Another feature of HART was to design handheld devices which would display surveillance video to small unit leaders in the field (as opposed to only being available to officers/agents in a control room). A third significant feature is that troops can request surveillance in an area, and a set of drones will automatically come over and take care of it themselves—all the soldiers have to do is ask for it, and then they can forget about it.

The UAVs can be commanded to automatically and intelligently perform a number of tasks, with very little direct control required, such as:

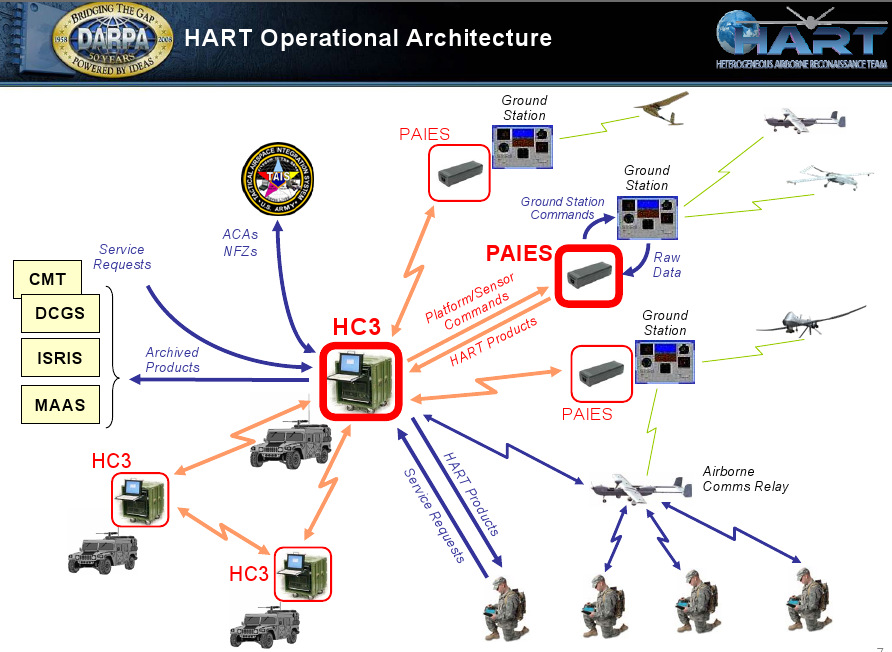
Drawing of HART operational architecture from official IPTO (DARPA) website

- Area surveillance—patrolling a certain area for unusual activity
- Route recon—e.g. patrolling a road or power line
- Human / vehicle tracking—following a vehicle or person and reporting any suspicious activity

HART was very successful, and demonstrated the following technical capabilities:

- Automated task management—the drones are able to notice suspicious behavior, and figure out the best way to allocate UAVs to deal with the situation, without a human telling them what to do
- Automated flight path and sensor planning—the drones are able to automatically plan flight routes and point/focus/zoom cameras
- Automated airspace deconfliction—even with large numbers of drones flying around, they are able to communicate with each other, and prevent collisions
- Dissemination of raw full motion video (FMV) or stabilized, georegistered, multi-platform mosaics within seconds
- Easy video playback—the humans on the ground can quickly and easily get "instant-replay" features on video (i.e. they can get a live feed or playback stored video
- Responsiveness to commanders, analysts, and frontline troops

According to Northrop Grumman, in addition to its military uses, HART also has numerous applications in homeland security (domestic surveillance) and border patrol.

== Video ==
There are several videos from DARPA's website that give a clear presentation of the capabilities and purpose of HART/HURT systems:

- HURT "Victorville" video—this is the clearest and most informative of the videos.
- HURT "Concept Video"—note how the drones track the people when they notice the "suspicious" behavior of getting into a van ...
- HURT "29 Palms" Video
- All links to video's inactive as of 7/18/13

== See also ==
- Human Identification at a Distance
- Surveillance
- Unmanned combat aerial vehicle
