= Surveillance in the Ottoman Empire =

During the reign of Mehmed II in the 15th and 16th centuries of the Ottoman Empire the use of effective record keeping allowed for a vast and detailed archive of information about its population. This included Tahrir, or land surveys, which were executed on a regular basis in order to keep up-to-date accounts of economic, security, and taxation data of the Ottoman population. These reports initiated a long history of surveillance and intelligence keeping within the Empire.

== Modern advances in surveillance ==
In the 18th century, during the Nizam-i Djedid period, Ottoman foreign relations and modernization were in full progression. This constituted that foreign nationals, particularly European ambassadors, had increasing access to the Ottoman state’s government and policies. This influx of foreign nationals presented a serious security problem for the Ottoman Empire in which the fear of espionage became a reality. In order to tighten security proceedings of cross-border officials, the Ottoman government required constant surveillance of dignitaries during their visits. This included perpetual accompaniment by Ottoman authority and review of all foreign documents and reports that were being sent across the empire’s borders.

Conversely, spies from the Ottoman government were sent to foreign states to bring back information that could potentially assist in strategic military movement and economic policy. Among other foreign attributions to reconnaissance were that of Ottoman vassal states, which collected information and intelligence outside of the Ottoman borders and submitted this knowledge back to the government for Ottoman use. The domestic surveillance policy was generally made up of spies and intelligence-gathering local authorities, whose collected information was distributed to the state’s central intelligence for processing.

== Corruption ==
The 19th century introduced Sultan Abdul Hamid II, whose paranoia and excessive concern for both foreign and domestic surveillance brought about altered forms of intelligence gathering. Spies were commended by Sultan Hamid II for issuing reports on their neighbors and the general populace. These spies were therefore encouraged, and in some cases required, to submit reports on as many citizens as possible. Especially in border regions where loyalty to the Sultan was further questioned, spies and Hamid II’s Secret Police initiated patrols of these border areas in order to collect evidence. Corruption became a harsh repercussion of enhanced surveillance, primarily because of the increasing status of spies. Individuals who contributed a great number of reports to the Sultan were subsequently deemed loyal and would achieve heightened status and promotion. The reports that were being turned in often were false or pertained to unimportant events. Reports were turned in so commonly that innocent civilians were often subjugated to interrogation, while the informant reaped the benefits.

Corruption became evident throughout the empire because of the increased surveillance, and caused a variety of issues with the Empire's stability. However, though Ottoman intelligence collection was not at the level of many modern western European states, such as the Spanish and the Venetians, the need for secure borders and protection of the state quickly created this more advanced system of investigation and record keeping which allowed for necessary military and government tactics.
