= TrapWire =

American software and services company

Trapwire
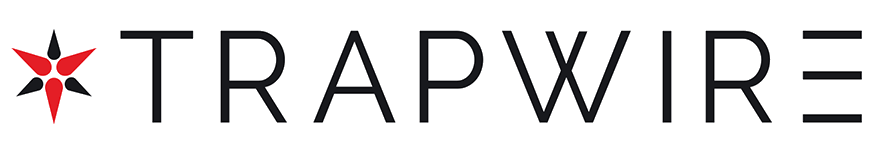
- Company type: Private
- Industry: Security
- Founded: 2004; 22 years ago
- Founder: Richard "Hollis" Helms
- Headquarters: Reston, VA
- Key people: Dan Botsch, President; Michael Maness, Dir. Business Development; Mike Chang, Dir. Operations; Paul Chadha, Dir. Technology and Product Development
- Products: TrapWire Threat Detection Platform
- Services: Threat detection and mitigation Surveillance detection Threat assessments Training
- Website: www.trapwire.com

TrapWire is an American software and services company focused on risk mitigation and threat detection. Headquartered in Virginia, the company blends proprietary analytic tools and Artificial Intelligence to produce a homonymous software system to help its users find patterns indicative of terrorist attacks and other criminal events.

== History ==
The company was founded in 2004 by Richard "Hollis" Helms as a division of Abraxas Corporation, a company formed by C.I.A. officers in response to the increasing threats posed by terrorist organizations against US targets. Helms is the former head of the C.I.A's European division.

According to company documents, the first deployment of the TrapWire system appears to have occurred in 2007 and was originally built and deployed to protect US critical infrastructure. The system currently provides physical security and threat detection services to more than 2,000 public and private sector sites across the US. The system is being used to identify threats ranging from terrorism to organized crime, human trafficking, fraud and crimes against children.

== Products ==
The TrapWire flagship product is a cloud-based threat-detection technology that received US government FedRAMP authorization in 2018. The system provides a common operating platform for analysis and information sharing between various government and private sector entities. TrapWire registered as a trademark with the United States Patent and Trademark Office. In the submitted document, the system is described in detail. The assumption is that terrorists and criminals are vulnerable due to their need to conduct pre-attack surveillance, "such as photographing, measuring and signaling". Such suspicious activities, as detected in imagery or human reports, are entered into a database using a "10-characteristic description of individuals" or vehicle information. The data is correlated across the network, claiming a "network effect" of increased security due to this correlation. The result is a TrapWire Threat Meter (TIM) level which may be monitored by security personnel.

== Clients ==
TrapWire does not list its clients online; however, a review of publicly available documents indicates the firm's clients include, among others, the US military, state and local law enforcement, Fusion Centers, financial institutions, transportation hubs, energy sites, and the hospitality and gaming industry. For example, The Texas Monitor claimed that TrapWire formed an increasing size of contract with Texas.

== Incidents ==
In August 2012, the hack of a US-based company, Stratfor, resulted in more than one million internal Stratfor emails published via WikiLeaks. Included in the emails were claims made by Stratfor employees about the size, scope and capability of the TrapWire system. A review of various news, business and social media articles suggests these claims may be overblown. According to the Stratfor emails, TrapWire software “facilitates intelligence-gathering on US and global citizens, using surveillance technology, incident reports from citizens, and data correlation for local police and law enforcement agencies".

In one leaked email, Stratfor vice president Fred Burton stated TrapWire is in place at every high-value target in New York City, Washington, D.C., and Los Angeles, as well as London and Ottawa.
