= ADVISE =

US Department of Homeland Security R&D program

ADVISE (Analysis, Dissemination, Visualization, Insight, and Semantic Enhancement) was a research and development program within the United States Department of Homeland Security (DHS) Threat and Vulnerability Testing and Assessment (TVTA) portfolio.

The program was reportedly developing a massive data mining system, which would collect and analyze data on everyone in the United States and perform a "threat analysis" on them. The data would have been anything from financial records, phone records, emails, blog entries, website searches, to any other electronic information that can be put into a computer system. This information would then be analyzed and used to monitor social threats such as community-forming, terrorism, political organizing, or crime. The program was planned for the storage of one quadrillion data entities.

The exact scope and degree of completion of ADVISE was unclear. The program was in the 2004–2006 Federal DHS Budget as a component of the $47 million TVTA program. It was purportedly scrapped in September 2007 after the agency's internal inspector general found that pilot testing of the system had been performed using data on real people without required privacy safeguards in place.

== See also ==
- Data warehouse
- Defense Advanced Research Projects Agency (DARPA)
- ECHELON
- Information Awareness Office
- NSA warrantless surveillance controversy
- TALON (Threat and Local Observation Notice)
