= TALON (database) =

Database maintained by the US Air Force

TALON (Threat and Local Observation Notice) was a database maintained by the United States Air Force after the September 11th terrorist attacks. It was authorized for creation in 2002 by Deputy Defense Secretary Paul D. Wolfowitz, in order to collect and evaluate information about possible threats to US servicemembers and civilian workers in the US and at overseas military installations. The database included lists of anti-war groups and people who have attended anti-war rallies. TALON reports are collected by various US Department of Defense agencies including law enforcement, intelligence, counterintelligence and security, and were analyzed by a Pentagon agency, the Counterintelligence Field Activity. CIFA had existed since 2004, and its size and budget are secret.

On August 21, 2007, the US Defense Department announced that it would shut down the database, as the database had been criticized for gathering information on peace activists and other political activists who posed no credible threat, but who had been one topic of this database due to their political views. The department is working on a new system which would replace TALON, but for the time being, information on force protection threats will be handled by the FBI’s Guardian reporting system.

== See also ==
- ADVISE
- Civil liberties
- Fusion center
- Mass surveillance in the United States
- Patriot Act
- War on terror
