= QuIST =

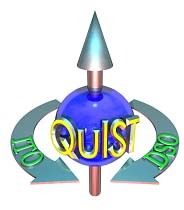
QuIST Program Logo

The Quantum Information Science and Technology Program (abbreviated as QUIST or QuIST) was a five-year, $100M DARPA research program that ran from FY 2001 – 2005. The initiative was jointly created by the Defense Sciences Office (DSO) and the Information Technology Office (ITO) to accelerate development in the field of quantum computing, quantum communications, quantum algorithms, and other high-priority quantum information applications. As a completed program, QuIST received an award from DARPA in 2008 for scientific breakthroughs previously conducted under its support.

== Research ==
In 2004, QuIST-funded researchers demonstrated the DARPA Quantum Network, the first working quantum key distribution network. At its start, it employed coherent laser pulses over optical fiber media, sending unconditionally-secure messages between Harvard University, Boston University and BBN Technologies in Cambridge, Massachusetts. It later grew to a fully operational, 10 node network, conveying key material both through telecom fiber and the atmosphere. The work was given a DARPA award four years later.

== See also ==
- IARPA – Intelligence Advanced Research Projects Agency
- QuEST – Quantum Entanglement Science and Technology
