= DARPA LifeLog =

U.S. defense data-logging program

LifeLog was a project of the Information Processing Techniques Office of the Defense Advanced Research Projects Agency (DARPA) of the U.S. Department of Defense (DOD). According to its bid solicitation pamphlet in 2003, it was to be "an ontology-based (sub)system that captures, stores, and makes accessible the flow of one person's experience in and interactions with the world in order to support a broad spectrum of associates/assistants and other system capabilities". The objective of the LifeLog concept was "to be able to trace the 'threads' of an individual's life in terms of events, states, and relationships", and it has the ability to "take in all of a subject's experience, from phone numbers dialed and e-mail messages viewed to every breath taken, step made and place gone".

== Goals and capabilities ==
LifeLog aimed to compile a massive electronic database of every activity and relationship a person engages in. This was to include credit card purchases, web sites visited, the content of telephone calls and e-mails sent and received, scans of faxes and postal mail sent and received, instant messages sent and received, books and magazines read, television and radio selections, physical location recorded via wearable GPS sensors, biomedical data captured through wearable sensors. The high level goal of this data logging was to identify "preferences, plans, goals, and other markers of intentionality".

Another of DARPA's goals for LifeLog had a predictive function. It sought to “find meaningful patterns in the timeline, to infer the user’s routines, habits, and relationships with other people, organizations, places, and objects, and to exploit these patterns to ease its task".

Generically, the term lifelog or flog is used to describe a storage system that can automatically and persistently record and archive some informational dimension of an object's (object lifelog) or user's (user lifelog) life experience in a particular data category.

News reports in the media described LifeLog as the "diary to end all diaries—a multimedia, digital record of everywhere you go and everything you see, hear, read, say and touch".

According to U.S. government officials, LifeLog is not connected with DARPA's Total Information Awareness.

The LifeLog program was cancelled on February 4th 2004, the same day Facebook was launched, after criticism concerning the privacy implications of the system.

== See also ==
- Information Processing Techniques Office
- Information Awareness Office
- Lifelogging
- Surveillance
  - Palantir
- Facebook, a social media website perceived by some to be similar to the project.
