= Lukasiak =

Lukasiak is a surname. Notable people with the surname include:

- Agnieszka Lukasiak (born 1977), Polish-born film director
- Chloe Lukasiak (born 2001), American actress, dancer, author, television personality, and model
- Oskar Lukasiak (born 1991), Swedish darts player

== See also ==
- Łukasik
