= XG =

XG or xG may refer to:

== Organizations ==
- XG Technology, a wireless communications company
- Clickair (former IATA code: XG), a 2006–2009 Spanish low-cost airline
- SunExpress Deutschland (former IATA code: XG), a 2011–2020 German leisure airline

== Science and technology ==
- Xg antigen system, a red blood cell surface antigen system
- DARPA XG, a DARPA communication program
- Hyundai XG, a Hyundai car model
- Yamaha XG, a Yamaha extension to the General MIDI standard

== Other uses ==
- XG (group), a vocal group
- Extreme-G, a video game
- Expected goals (xG), a performance metric used to evaluate football team and player performance
