= Proto 2 (disambiguation) =

Proto 2 may refer to:

- Proto 2, the name of an initiative of the Defense Advanced Research Projects Agency, or DARPA.
- Proto 2 (aircraft), a Romanian biplane manufactured in 1924.
