= Sunghyun Choi =

South Korean electrical engineer (born 1970)

- Born: 1970 (age 55–56); South Korea
- Education: Korea Advanced Institute of Science and Technology; University of Michigan
- Scientific career
- Fields: Wireless networks
- Workplaces: Samsung Electronics

Sunghyun Choi (Korean: 최성현; born 1970) is an electrical engineer and academic.

He is an Executive Vice President and Head of the Advanced Communications Research Center at Samsung Research, Samsung Electronics, Seoul, Korea. He was a professor at the Department of Electrical and Computer Engineering, Seoul National University (SNU), Seoul, Korea from Sept. 2002 to Aug. 2019, and served as a Vice Dean for Academic Affairs, College of Engineering during the last two years at SNU. Before joining SNU in September 2002, he was with Philips Research USA, Briarcliff Manor, New York, USA, as a Senior Member Research Staff for three years. He was also a visiting associate professor at the Electrical Engineering department, Stanford University, USA, from June 2009 to June 2010. He received his B.S. (summa cum laude) and M.S. degrees in electrical engineering from Korea Advanced Institute of Science and Technology (KAIST) in 1992 and 1994, respectively, and received Ph.D. at the Department of Electrical Engineering and Computer Science, The University of Michigan, Ann Arbor in September 1999.

He is currently heading researches and standardization for 6G, B5G, and IoT connectivity at Samsung Research. He co-authored over 250 technical papers and a book Broadband Wireless Access and Local Networks: Mobile WiMAX and WiFi Artech House, 2008 (with B. G. Lee). He holds over 160 patents, and numerous patents pending. He has served as a Program Committee Co-chair of IEEE WCNC 2020, IEEE DySPAN 2018, ACM Multimedia 2007, and IEEE WoWMoM 2007. He has also served on program and organization committees of numerous leading wireless and networking conferences including ACM MobiCom, IEEE INFOCOM, IEEE SECON, and IEEE WoWMoM. He is also currently serving as an editor of IEEE Transactions on Wireless Communications, and served as an editor of IEEE Transactions on Mobile Computing, IEEE Wireless Communications Magazine, ACM SIGMOBILE Mobile Computing and Communications Review, Journal of Communications and Networks, Computer Networks, and Computer Communications. He has served as a guest editor for IEEE Journal on Selected Areas in Communications, IEEE Wireless Communications, and ACM Wireless Networks. From 2000 to 2007, he was an active contributor to IEEE 802.11 WLAN Working Group.

He has received numerous awards including KICS Dr. Irwin Jacobs Award (2013), Shinyang Scholarship Award (2011), Presidential Young Scientist Award (2008), IEEK/IEEE Joint Award for Young IT Engineer (2007), Outstanding Research Award (2008) and Best Teaching Award (2006), both from the College of Engineering, Seoul National University, the Best Paper Award from IEEE WoWMoM 2008, and Recognition of Service Award (2005, 2007) from ACM. Dr. Choi was a recipient of the Korea Foundation for Advanced Studies (KFAS) Scholarship and the Korean Government Overseas Scholarship during 1997-1999 and 1994–1997, respectively. He was named IEEE fellow in 2014 for the contribution to the development of WLAN protocols.

== Professional membership ==
- Fellow, IEEE since 2014 (S'96-M'00-SM'05-F'14)
- Voting member, IEEE 802.11 Working Group (WG) from 2000 to 2007
- Lifetime Member, The Korea Institute of Communications and Information Sciences (KICS) since 2004
