= NOMARS =

U.S. technology of unmanning surface vehicle

NOMARS (No Manning Required, Ship) is a concept for a range of ships and smaller watercraft operating as unmanned surface vessels (USV) for the US Department of Defense, developed by the Defense Advanced Research Projects Agency (DARPA).

The USV concept crafts range in size and form. Examples include:

- Sea Hunter, a DARPA-developed trimaran USV launched in 2016.
- A dual hulled platform, proposed in a concept by Austal USA.
- A single hulled missile ship with a propulsor and steering pod.

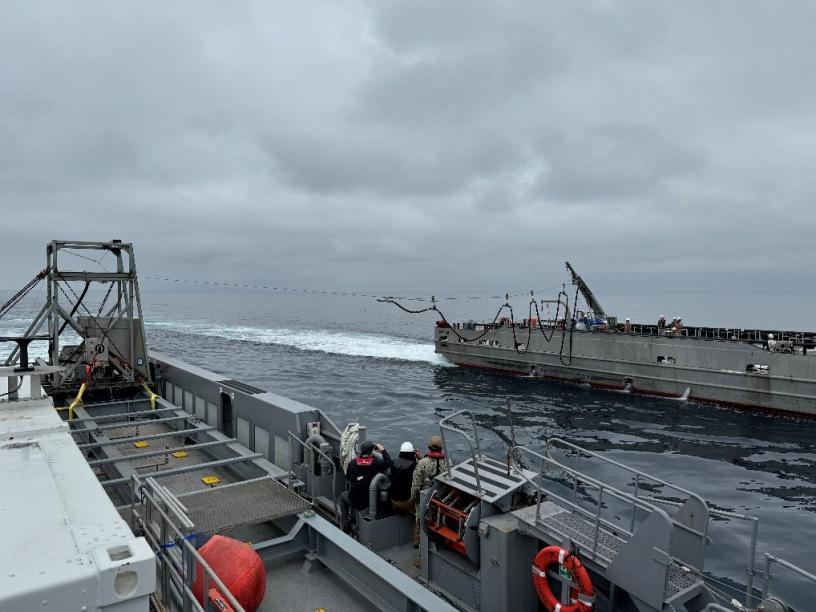
In a test as part of DARPA’s NOMARS program, the USV Mariner (right) deploys a refueling probe towards the USV Ranger (left) in the first test of fueling at sea (FAS) without any human interaction required on the part of the receiving vessel. The personnel aboard the Ranger are observers only.

By removing the human element from all ship design considerations, NOMARS will demonstrate significant advantages, to include size, cost (procurement, operations, and sustainment), at-sea reliability, survivability to sea-state, survivability to adversary actions (stealth considerations, resistance to tampering, etc.), and hydrodynamic efficiency (hull optimization without consideration for crew safety or comfort).

In 2022, ship designer Serco was selected to develop the NOMARS program through building, testing, and demonstrating the first generation ship.

In December 2024, NOMARS completed a successful first test of at-sea refueling designed for use with the USV Defiant.

USX-1 Defiant, the 180-foot-long, 240-metric ton medium USV, was first seen in public in March 2025 near the U.S. Navy's Naval Air Station (NAS) Whidbey Island. USX-1 Defiant does not have any mission or combat systems installed onboard and will conduct sea trials in the spring of 2025.
