= Biologically inspired cognitive architectures =

Biologically Inspired Cognitive Architectures (BICA) was a DARPA project administered by the Information Processing Technology Office (IPTO). BICA began in 2005 and is designed to create the next generation of cognitive architecture models of human artificial intelligence. Its first phase (Design) ran from September 2005 to around October 2006, and was intended to generate new ideas for biological architectures that could be used to create embodied computational architectures of human intelligence.

The second phase (Implementation) of BICA was set to begin in the spring of 2007, and would have involved the actual construction of new intelligent agents that live and behave in a virtual environment. However, this phase was canceled by DARPA, reportedly because it was seen as being too ambitious.

Now BICA is a transdisciplinary study that aims to design, characterise and implement human-level cognitive architectures. There is also BICA Society, a scientific nonprofit organization formed to promote and facilitate this study. On their website, they have an extensive comparison table of various cognitive architectures.
