= QuEST =

Research program

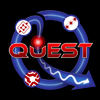
QuEST Program Logo

Quantum Entanglement Science and Technology (QuEST) is a research program, announced by the DARPA Microsystems Technology Office (MTO) in 2008. As a follow-on to the QuIST Program, its goal was to further accelerate development in the field of quantum information science.

Example areas under investigation included:

- Shor's factoring algorithm,
- Quantum machine learning,
- Quantum game theory,
- Secure quantum communications,
- Quantum ghost imaging and interaction-free measurement, quantum image processing,
- Remote sensing, quantum radar and quantum metrology, e.g. entanglement-assisted gravitomagnetic interferometry.

== See also ==
- IARPA – Intelligence Advanced Research Projects Agency
