= Consortium for Execution of Rendezvous and Servicing Operations =

Program started by the Defense Advanced Research Projects Agency

The Consortium for Execution of Rendezvous and Servicing Operations (CONFERS) was a program started by the Defense Advanced Research Projects Agency (DARPA) in 2017. The goal was to address the lack of widely accepted technical and safety standards for on-orbit servicing activities involving commercial satellites. In partnership with NASA, the CONFERS program was to establish a permanent, self-sustaining, and independent forum where industry could engage with the U.S. Government to collaborate and create standards for on-orbit servicing.

In 2017, DARPA provided funding to Advanced Technology International to form the consortium as an industry-led initiative. Since 2018, CONFERS has held the annual Global Satellite Servicing Forum & Exhibition.

In 2022, International Standards Organization (ISO) adopted CONFERS’ standard as ISO 24330, Space systems — Rendezvous and Proximity Operations (RPO) and On Orbit Servicing (OOS).

In October 2022, CONFERS transitioned from DARPA and reincorporated itself as the independent, member-supported, non-profit [501(c)(6)] global trade association developing industry-led recommendations for voluntary consensus standards and guiding international policies for satellite servicing that contribute to a sustainable, safe, and diverse space economy.
