= Handheld Isothermal Silver Standard Sensor =

Biological weapon detection project

The Handheld Isothermal Silver Standard Sensor (HISSS) project was sponsored by DARPA in the 2000s to develop a hand-held sensor that is capable of identifying biological weapon threats across the entire spectrum including bacteria, viruses and toxins. The program began in early part of the 21st century with the following goals:

- DNA detection without polymerase chain reaction (PCR)
- RNA detection without PCR or reverse transcription
- antibody-based protein detection at sensitivities unachievable by traditional methods

The final goal was to give field units the ability to detect threat agents across the complete spectrum of biological warfare weapons.

The main contractor for this project was Northrop Grumman with subcontractors Ionian Technologies and Ribomed.
