= DARPA GXV-T =

The Defense Advanced Research Projects Agency (DARPA) Ground X-Vehicle Technology (GXV-T) project is an effort to develop technologies and designs to create lighter future armored military vehicles.

== Background ==
Since the creation of the main battle tank during Cold War, there has been a constant arms race between the development of anti-armor weapons and vehicle protection systems. As weapons became more sophisticated, tanks and other armored vehicles added thicker armor, created composite solutions like Chobham armor, and developed countermeasures like reactive armor and electronic countermeasures. While vehicles became more protected, increasing the amounts of armor made them larger and heavier, more expensive and less mobile; the British Challenger 2 tank weighs 62.5 tonnes (68.9 tons) and costs about £4.2 million (US$7 million). This limits the roads and bridges they can use, makes them difficult to deploy quickly, and increases the expense to build and maintain them. As anti-tank weapons continue to get more effective, simply increasing the level of armor may require future armored vehicles to grow beyond usefulness.

GXV-T seeks to develop ways to protect vehicles and their occupants using mobility rather than relying on armor for survival. The U.S. Army explored a similar survivability-through-mobility concept with the Future Combat Systems program that aimed to create 18 separate combat vehicles tied to a network. The program was ultimately cancelled, partly because of experiences during combat in Iraq and Afghanistan where improvised explosive devices proved deadly to lightly armored vehicles. GXV-T is not to create a large family of systems, but to further explore the concept with smaller and simpler prototypes.

== Objectives ==
DARPA is not looking to replace any single vehicle or vehicle family through GXV-T, but to identify ways to break the "more armor" paradigm that has been the cornerstone of mechanized vehicle protection for the past century. Weapons’ ability to penetrate armor has advanced faster than armor’s ability to withstand penetration, so even incremental improvements in crew survivability require significant increases in vehicle mass and cost. The GXV-T program seeks to investigate revolutionary ground-vehicle technologies to simultaneously improve mobility and survivability through means other than adding more armor, including avoiding detection, engagement, and hits by autonomously avoiding inbound threats. The hope is to make next-generation armored vehicles smaller, faster, and more maneuverable than current vehicles. Inspiration for the effort came from X-plane programs, which have improved aircraft capabilities by pursuing groundbreaking fundamental research and development.

Technical goals for improvement over current vehicles are to:

- Reduce vehicle size and weight by 50 percent
- Reduce crewman needs by 50 percent
- Increase vehicle speed by 100 percent
- Accesses 95 percent of terrain
- Reduce signatures that would be detectable by enemies

Four technical areas as examples where advanced technologies could be developed to meet program objectives are:

- Radically Enhanced Mobility – Ability to traverse diverse off-road terrain, including slopes, various elevations, and a range of surfaces and gradients; advanced suspensions and redefined track or wheel configurations; extreme speed; rapid omnidirectional movement changes in three dimensions
- Survivability through Agility – Autonomously avoid incoming threats without harming occupants through technologies such as agile motion (dodging) and active repositioning of armor
- Crew Augmentation – Improved physical and electronically assisted situational awareness for crew and passengers; semi-autonomous driver assistance and automation of key crew functions
- Signature Management – Reduction of detectable signatures, including visible, infrared (IR), acoustic, and electromagnetic (EM)

Initial contracts are scheduled to be awarded by April 2015 to develop technologies over the next 24 months. Research, development, design and testing, and evaluation of subsystem capabilities in multiple areas will then be integrated into future ground X-vehicle demonstrators, which may be built by April 2017.

== Designs ==
In May 2014, three months before DARPA started the GXV-T program, the Tank Automotive Research, Development and Engineering Center (TARDEC), which provides the technological backbone for all Army and U.S. Marine Corps ground vehicles, issued a report called "GXV Operational Vignettes" which included two dozen pages of sketches of next-generation ground combat vehicle designs. TARDEC confirmed in September 2014 that the drawings were part of the Army’s contribution to the DARPA effort. TARDEC’s advanced concepts team offered views of a possible GXV design with features including: a swiveling turret that can "sense" an enemy sniper; being small enough to store eight vehicles in one C-17 Globemaster III and light enough to be airdropped, while transporting up to 96 troops on four independent tracks that can maneuver like wheels to traverse uneven terrain and move through urban environments; and deflecting incoming ordnance with "movable armor" and stopping a rocket-propelled grenade in midair using an unnamed weapons system. DARPA-generated concept art shows a vehicle with large wheels instead of tracks. Due to the early stages of various concepts, it is unknown what vehicles (if any) the GXV might replace, when it would reach early production stages, or even whether the designs will resemble the final product.

DARPA released a concept video on 8 October 2014 showing how the GXV could improve situational awareness. Armored vehicles have lower situational awareness than other types of vehicles, so the agency's solution is to have wide-angle cockpits like a jet fighter. The concept would provide the driver with a closed cockpit that incorporates visualization technologies to provide wide-angle, high-definition visibility of the outside environment. The video showed the display as able to highlight optimal routes over difficult terrain, show both infrared and terrain classification views, and visually track allies and adversaries. It also includes autopilot abilities, allowing the driver to focus on strategic activities and decisions.

On 8 September 2015, QinetiQ announced DARPA had awarded it a $1.5 million contract to develop an electric hub-drive to improve survivability and mobility for the GXV-T. The hub-drive seeks to improve mobility through enhanced power, torque, integral braking, and high efficiency in a unit that can be contained within a 20 in (51 cm) wheel rim. It will be designed without drive shafts and gearboxes, enhancing survivability should an underbody blast hit the vehicle and lightening weight to allow for fully independent suspension with significantly increased travel. QinetiQ's hub-drive aims to combine optimum performance with significant weight savings and give greater architectural flexibility to create alternative layout configurations. On 11 February 2016, Honeywell announced it had signed an agreement with DARPA to provide the GXV-T program with a virtual reality instrument panel that replaces glass windows with display technology. The virtual window technology provides a 360-degree view outside the vehicle rather than relying on looking through windows alone.

In April 2016, DARPA revealed they had awarded contracts to eight companies to develop GXV-T technologies: Carnegie Mellon University; Honeywell International Inc.; Leidos; Pratt & Miller; QinetiQ Inc.; Raytheon BBN; Southwest Research Institute; and SRI International.

In June 2018, DARPA leaders demonstrated a number of new technologies that were developed within the framework of the GXV-T program. The goal of this program is to create a lightly armored combat vehicle of not very large dimensions, which, due to maneuverability and other tricks, can successfully resist modern anti-tank weapon systems.

== See also ==
- Future Combat Systems
- Ultra Light Combat Vehicle
