= High Performance Knowledge Bases =

DARPA research program

The High Performance Knowledge Bases (HPKB) was a DARPA research program to advance the technology of how computers acquire, represent and manipulate knowledge. The successor of the HPKB project was the Rapid Knowledge Formation (RKF) project.

The primary results of the HPKB project was to focus further research on the Knowledge acquisition bottleneck problem.

HPKB was divided programmatically into three groups:

1. Integrators
2. Technology developers
3. Challenge problem developers

== See also ==
- Knowledge base
- Cyc - commercial knowledge base
- OpenCyc - Open source version of Cyc
- Electronic Directory Research (EDR) - Japanese large knowledge base effort
- Project Halo - Ultimate successor project
- Rapid Knowledge Formation (RKF)- follow-on project
- SUMO - Suggested Upper Merged Ontology
- Wikipedia - example of large knowledge base that is not yet semantically parsable
- WordNet - a semantic network of words, terms used in the English language
