= Łukasik =

Łukasik is a gender-neutral Polish surname that may refer to:

- Andrzej Łukasik (born 1955), Polish jazz musician
- Anna Łukasik (born 1987), Polish dressage rider
- Daniel Łukasik (born 1991), Polish football midfielder
- Joseph Lukasik (born 1962), American composer
- Justyna Łukasik (born 1993), Polish volleyball player
- Martyna Łukasik (born 1999), Polish volleyball player
- Stephen J. Lukasik (1931–2019), American physicist
