= Anthony Tether =

DARPA director (born 1941)

Anthony J. Tether (born c. 1941) was Director of the Defense Advanced Research Projects Agency (DARPA) from June 2001, until February 2009. As Director, Tether was responsible for management of the Agency's projects for high-payoff, innovative research and development. In 2020, he became a consultant with MISTRAS Group, USA.

== Early life ==
Tether received his Bachelor of Electrical Engineering from Rensselaer Polytechnic Institute in 1964, and his Master of Science (1965) and Ph.D. (1969) in Electrical Engineering from Stanford University.

== Career ==
In 2009, Tether re-formed The Sequoia Group, which has government and industrial clients. The Sequoia Group provides program management and strategy development services to government and industry. Tether is on several Advisory and Corporate Boards, and is a Distinguished Fellow with the Council on Competitiveness located in Washington DC. He is also on the fund management team for Ellington Healthcare Partners, which invests in start-up and early stage companies with unique therapeutic products and devices; other fund managers include former Governor Tommy Thompson.

From 1996 to 2001, Tether held the position of CEO and President of The Sequoia Group, which he founded in 1996. From 1994 to 1996, Tether was CEO for Dynamics Technology Inc. From 1992 to 1994, he was vice president at Science Applications International Corporation's (SAIC) Advanced Technology Sector, and then Vice President and General Manager for Range Systems at SAIC. Prior to this, he spent six years as vice president for Technology and Advanced Development at Ford Aerospace, which was acquired by Loral Corporation during that period.

He has held other positions in the Defense Department, as director of DARPA's Strategic Technology Office from 1982 to 1986, and as Director National Intelligence in the Office of the Secretary of Defense from 1978 to 1982. He was Vice President of Systems Control Inc., a company he helped start after receiving his Ph.D., where he applied stochastic estimation and control theory to military and commercial problems with concentration on development of algorithms to perform real-time resource allocation and control.

Tether has been on the Army, Navy and Defense Science Boards, and on the Office of National Drug Control Policy Research and Development Committee. He is a Life Fellow of the Institute of Electrical and Electronics Engineers (IEEE) and is listed in several Who's Who publications.

Tether is notable for initiating the series of DARPA Grand Challenges which marked the resurgence of research in autonomous vehicles. As of September 8, 2009, Tether is a member of the SSCI Scientific Advisory Board.

== Awards ==
In 1986, Director Central Intelligence Bill Casey honored him with the National Intelligence Medal and Secretary of Defense Caspar Weinberger with the Department of Defense Civilian Meritorious Service Medal respectively. In 2008, he received the founders award from Council of Competitiveness. In 2009, Secretary of Defense Gates honored him with the Department of Defense Outstanding Public Service Medal. In 2013, AIAA awarded him the Aerospace Communications Award for aerospace communication contributions.

Government offices
Preceded by Fernando L. Fernandez	Director of DARPA; 2001–2009	Succeeded by Regina E. Dugan
