= Arati Prabhakar =

American engineer (born 1959)

- Prabhakar in 2022

12th Director of the Office of Science and Technology Policy
- In office October 3, 2022 – January 20, 2025
- President: Joe Biden
- Preceded by: Eric Lander
- Succeeded by: Michael Kratsios

22nd Science Advisor to the President
- In office October 3, 2022 – January 20, 2025
- President: Joe Biden
- Preceded by: Francis Collins (acting)
- Succeeded by: Michael Kratsios

20th Director of the Defense Advanced Research Projects Agency
- In office July 30, 2012 – January 20, 2017
- President: Barack Obama
- Preceded by: Regina E. Dugan
- Succeeded by: Steven Walker

10th Director of the National Institute of Standards and Technology
- In office 1993–1997
- President: Bill Clinton
- Preceded by: John Lyons
- Succeeded by: Raymond Kammer

Personal details
- Born: February 2, 1959 (age 67) New Delhi, India
- Citizenship: United States
- Party: Democratic
- Children: 2
- Education: Texas Tech University (BS); California Institute of Technology (MS, PhD)
- Scientific career
- Fields: Applied physics
- Workplaces: National Institute of Standards and Technology; U.S. Venture Partners; Defense Advanced Research Projects Agency
- Thesis: Investigation of Deep Level Defects in Semiconductor Material Systems (1985)
- Doctoral advisor: Thomas McGill
- Prabhakar's voice Prabhakar on the role of technical experience within a governmental position Recorded July 20, 2022

Arati Prabhakar (born February 2, 1959) is an American engineer and public official. From October 3, 2022 to January 20, 2025, she served as the 12th director of the White House Office of Science and Technology Policy ("OSTP") (aka the Science Advisor to the President in other administrations). Via her service as OSTP Director, she also served in the President's cabinet.

From 1993 to 1997, Prabhakar served as the 10th Director of the National Institute of Standards and Technology (NIST), the first woman to hold the position. Prabhakar served as 20th Director of DARPA (United States Defense Advanced Research Projects Agency) from 2012 to 2017. In 2019, she founded and became CEO of Actuate, a data-focused nonprofit organization.

== Early life and education ==
Prabhakar's family immigrated to the United States from New Delhi, India, when she was three; her mother was seeking an advanced degree in social work in Chicago. Prabhakar grew up in Lubbock, Texas, from age ten. Her mother encouraged her to pursue a doctorate from a very early age.

In 1979, she obtained a B.S. degree in electrical engineering from Texas Tech University in Lubbock, Texas. She earned an M.S. degree in electrical engineering in 1980 and a Ph.D. in applied physics in 1984, both from the California Institute of Technology. She was the first woman to earn a PhD in applied physics from Caltech.

== Career ==
After receiving her PhD, she went to Washington, D.C., on a 1984 to 1986 congressional fellowship with the Office of Technology Assessment. Prabhakar subsequently worked at DARPA from 1986 to 1993, initially as a program manager but later as founding director of DARPA's Microelectronics Technology Office.

At the age of 34, Prabhakar was appointed as head of the National Institute of Standards and Technology (NIST), a position she held from 1993 to 1997. After NIST, she was the Chief Technology Officer and senior vice president of Raychem from 1997 to 1998. She was then the vice president and later president of Interval Research from 1998 to 2000.

She joined U.S. Venture Partners from 2001 to 2011, focusing on investment in green technology and information technology startups. On July 30, 2012, she became the head of DARPA, replacing Regina E. Dugan. She left DARPA in January 2017.

Prabhakar was a Fellow at the Center for Advanced Study in the Behavioral Sciences (CASBS) at Stanford 2017–18. In 2019, she started Actuate, a nonprofit organization focused on issues including climate change and chronic diseases.

=== Biden Administration ===
In 2022, Prabhakar was appointed by President Joe Biden as Director of the White House Office of Science and Technology Policy (OSTP) and Science and Technology Advisor to the President, replacing Eric Lander upon his departure.

This made her the first woman and person of color to be confirmed by the U.S. Senate as the Director of the White House Office of Science and Technology Policy, and the first woman and first person of color to be the top science and technology advisor to the President.

Prabhakar was among Biden's top advisors on matters regarding artificial intelligence (AI) regulation, where she has endorsed AI safeguards. Under her leadership, OSTP contributed to improving health outcomes with the Biden Cancer Moonshot, promoting research and strategies to address climate and nature, and strengthening federally funded research and development.

=== Amicus brief ===
On July 25, 2025, Prabhakar filed an amicus brief in the case of New York v. Trump (25–1236 and 25-1314), the case brought by 23 attorneys general and the governor of Kentucky against the Trump administration’s federal funding freezes and grant cancellations. Many of the plaintiffs and amicus filers challenged the authority of the president to redirect Congressionally appropriated funds. Prabhakar’s brief details the lasting harms that the freeze will have on the efforts of scientific researchers who innovate for the nation’s health, security, and economy. It further warns that the freeze has created lasting damage to the United States’ status as a leader in scientific innovation, weakening the nation’s pipeline of scientists and engineers and depriving Americans of future scientific advancements.

== Awards and memberships ==
Prabhakar was a University of California Berkeley Executive Fellow in Applied Technology Policy in 2025, and delivered the 2025 commencement address for UC Berkeley’s School of Information.

Prabhakar is a member of the Institute of Electrical and Electronics Engineers and was named IEEE Fellow in 1997 for "leadership in partnering between industry and government to promote economic growth through the development of manufacturing technologies for semiconductor devices". She is a member of the National Academy of Engineering. She has also been named a Texas Tech Distinguished Engineer and a Distinguished Alumna of California Institute of Technology.

She was a member of the governing board for the Pew Research Center and a member of the U.S. National Academies' Science Technology and Economic Policy Board. She was a member of the board of directors of SRI International in 2012, and was also a member of the U.S. National Academies' Science Technology and Economic Policy Board and the College of Engineering Advisory Board at the University of California, Berkeley.

Prabhakar is featured in the Notable Women in Computing cards.

In 2024, TIME magazine listed Prabhakar among 100 most influential people in AI.

Government offices
Preceded by John Lyons	Director of the National Institute of Standards and Technology; 1993–1997	Succeeded by Raymond Kammer
Preceded by Regina E. Dugan	Director of the Defense Advanced Research Projects Agency; 2012–2017	Succeeded by Steven Walker
Political offices
Preceded by Alondra Nelson; Acting	Director of the Office of Science and Technology Policy; 2022–2025	Succeeded by Michael Kratsios
Preceded by Francis Collins; Acting	Science Advisor to the President; 2022–2025	Succeeded by Michael Kratsios
