= DARPA XG =

The neXt Generation program or XG is a technology development project sponsored by DARPA's Strategic Technology Office, with the goals to "develop both the enabling technologies and system concepts to dynamically redistribute allocated spectrum along with novel waveforms in order to provide dramatic improvements in assured military communications in support of a full range of worldwide deployments." It is financed by the United States government within the aim of developing a de facto standard for cognitive radio and dynamic spectrum regulation.

== Background ==
Particularly, XG is focused on the development of dynamic spectrum access (DSA) demonstration and capability as well as the evaluation of three fundamental principles, namely: the principle of "Do No Harm"; "Add Value" principle; and, DSA devices development that provide equivalent reliability and service. The first principle involves the design of DSA radios in a way that does not interfere with viable links while the second maintains that DSA radios offer positive benefit after all the overhead costs and resources are considered. In the Wireless World Research Forum of 27 October 2003, Preston Marshall, program manager of DARPA XG Program, said "The primary product of the XG program is not a new radio, but a set of advanced technologies for dynamic spectrum access."

== Projects and initiatives ==
From 2006 to 2008, DARPA held numerous XG program demonstrations such as the experiment that involved the deployment of a field of conventionally deconflicted wireless links that included typical military, public safety, and civilian point-to-point links, covering several kilometers. In 2006, an XG technology was deployed in a field trial and demonstrated a robust networking capability amid challenging mobile scenarios. The program is also engaged in the development of architectural framework, protocol design, and building prototypes for DSA networks. One of its notable projects is the One Shot XG system, which is being developed to improve the accuracy of military snipers by calculating variables such as crosswind condition, maximum effective range of the weapon, and weapon alignment.

== See also ==
- DySPAN: formerly known as the IEEE Standards Coordinating Committee 41 and previously the IEEE 1900 Standards Committee; works on Dynamic Spectrum Access Networks (DySPAN).
