= Information Innovation Office =

The Information Innovation Office (I2O) is one of the seven technical offices within DARPA, an agency of the U.S. Department of Defense that is responsible for the development of advanced technology for national security. I2O was created in 2010 by combining the Information Processing Techniques Office (IPTO) and the Transformational Convergence Technology Office (TCTO). The office focuses on basic and applied research in the areas of cyber security, data analytics, and human-machine symbiosis.

== Organization ==
The current I2O office director is John Launchbury, who joined DARPA as program manager in 2014 and was named director in 2015. Brian Pierce is the deputy director.

== Programs ==
DARPA programs continually start and stop depending on national security needs and research results, and the high-turnover rate of program managers. Some programs within I2O's research areas are:

- Assured Autonomy (AA): Creation of technology for continual assurance of Learning-Enabled Cyber-Physical Systems.
- Building Resource Adaptive Software Systems (BRASS): Creation of long-lived, survivable software systems that adapt to changing conditions on their own.
- Cleanslate design of Resilient, Adaptive, Secure Hosts (CRASH): Development of software techniques that allow a computer system to defend itself from hacks.
- Cyber Grand Challenge (CGC)
- Memex: Software that advances online search capabilities to extend into the deep web, the dark web, and nontraditional or multimedia content.
- Broad Operational Language Translation (BOLT): A program launched in 2011 to create automated translation and linguistic analysis.
- Explainable Artificial Intelligence (XAI): Create Artificial intelligence that can explain the decisions it makes.
- Plan X
