= Regina E. Dugan =

American businesswoman (born 1963)

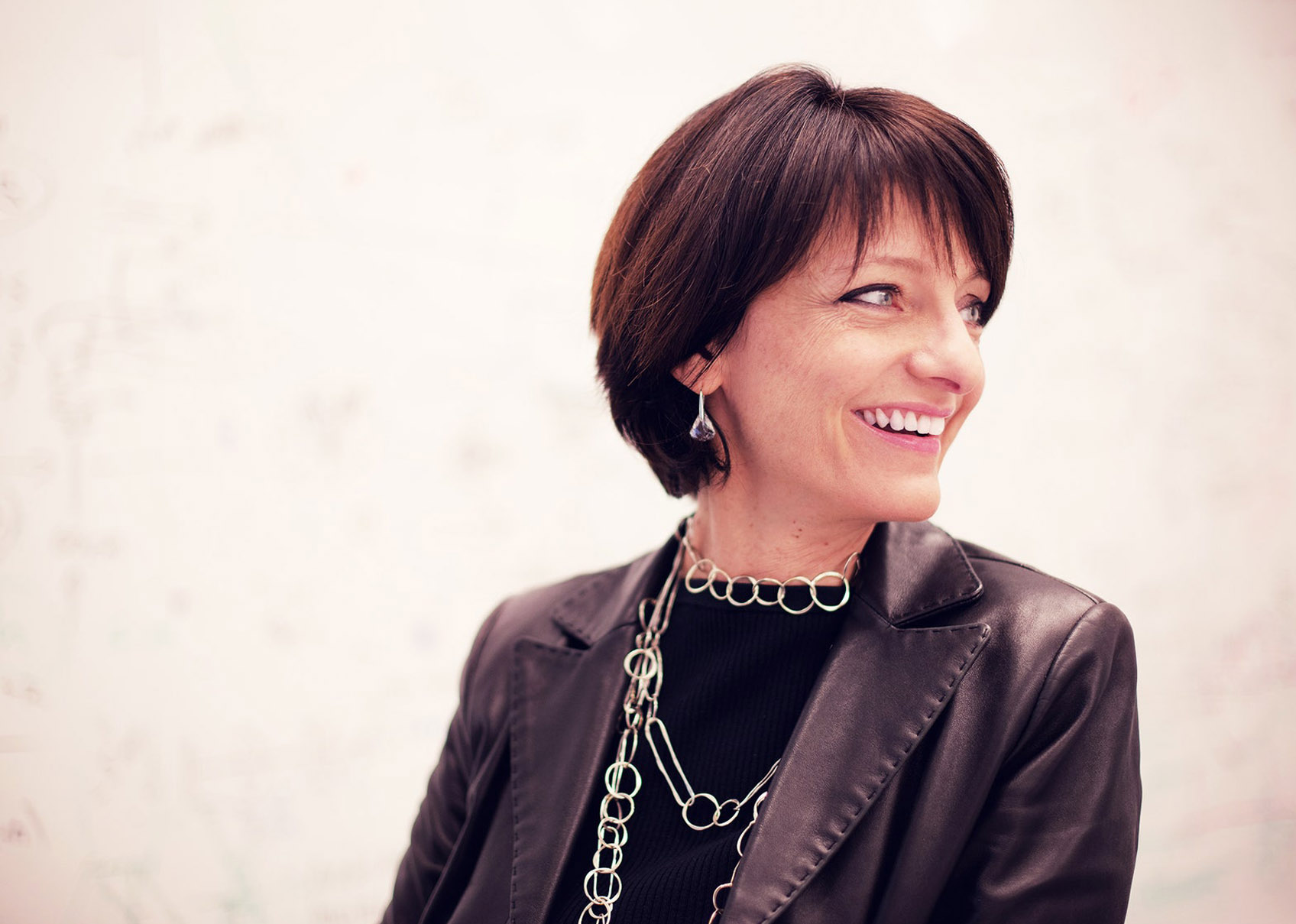
- Regina E. Dugan, circa. 2022

19th Director of the Defense Advanced Research Projects Agency
- In office July 20, 2009 – March 2012
- President: Barack Obama
- Preceded by: Anthony Tether
- Succeeded by: Arati Prabhakar

Personal details
- Born: Regina E. Dugan; March 19, 1963 (age 63) New York City, US
- Education: Virginia Tech (BS, MS); Caltech (PhD)
- Scientific career
- Fields: Engineering
- Workplaces: Facebook; Google ATAP; DARPA; RedXDefense; Dugan Ventures; NASA; Caltech
- Thesis: Axisymmetric buoyant jets in a cross flow with shear: Transition and mixing (1993)
- Doctoral advisor: E. John List

Regina E. Dugan (born March 19, 1963), is an American businesswoman, technology developer and government official. She was the first female director of the Defense Advanced Research Projects Agency (DARPA), where she served from July 2009 until March 2012.

Dugan began working for DARPA in 1996. Over the next 4 years, she led numerous multimillion-dollar research programs. Her most notable research project, known as the 'Dog's Nose,' involved the development of an advanced portable system that could detect the explosive content of landmines. In 1999, she was awarded 'Manager of the Year' for her work at DARPA and in 2000, she was honored with the Bronze de Fleury Medal by the United States Army Corps of Engineers. She has also received awards from the United States Secretary of Defense; specifically, the Awards for Exceptional Service and Outstanding Achievement.

Dugan left DARPA in 2000 to become a special advisor for the Vice Chief of Staff of the United States Army. Her work included a study titled 'Quick Reaction Study on Countermine,' which was briefed to senior members of the Joint Chiefs of Staff and implemented in Operation Enduring Freedom. Dugan also took positions on the Naval Research Advisory Committee, Threat Reduction Agency and Technology panel. Prior to DARPA, she founded a company called Dugan Ventures. In 2005, Dugan Ventures began a new investment, RedXDefense LLC.

After leaving DARPA in March 2012, she was appointed to an executive position at Google. There, she led and created Advanced Technology and Projects (ATAP) at Motorola Mobility, a subsidiary of Google. In January 2014, it was announced that Motorola Mobility would be acquired by Lenovo. Dugan and her team were retained by Google. She later moved to Facebook, joining a team called Building 8. In October 2017, she announced that she would be leaving in early 2018 to pursue other endeavors. In May 2020, she was announced as the CEO of Wellcome Leap.

== Education ==
Dugan obtained her Bachelor of Science and Master of Science degrees in mechanical engineering from Virginia Polytechnic Institute and State University (Virginia Tech) in Blacksburg, Virginia. In May 2013, she was inducted into the Virginia Tech College of Engineering Academy of Engineering Excellence.

Dugan was awarded a PhD by the California Institute of Technology (Caltech). Her thesis was titled “Axisymmetric buoyant jets in a cross flow with shear transition and mixing.”

== Career ==
=== Wellcome Leap ===
In 2020, Wellcome Trust created Wellcome Leap as an arm of the foundation and appointed Dugan as its CEO. Wellcome Leap applies the DARPA model globally, orchestrating a network of more than 1mn scientists and engineers. Its programs include stratifying depression to match patients with the right treatments and studying in utero care to cut the incidence of stillbirths by half.

=== Facebook ===
In April 2016, Dugan left Google to head Facebook's 'Building 8', a research division similar to Google's ATAP group.

In October 2017, Dugan announced she would be leaving Facebook in early 2018 to focus on building and leading a new endeavor.

=== Google ===
Dugan's advanced technology group was not a part of the Lenovo acquisition of Motorola Mobility. In February 2014, Dugan rejoined Google as Vice President of Engineering-Advanced Technology and Projects. ATAP developed Project Tango and Project Ara. In December 2018 The Register published an article alleging that her team were responsible for an attempt to patent an idea presented to them earlier by an MIT academic (Ji Qie) and that the subsequent involvement of MIT authorities forced them to back down and drop the application.

=== Motorola ===
Shortly after the Google acquisition of Motorola Mobility closed, Dugan was tasked with creating the Advanced Technology and Projects group, a skunkworks-inspired team chartered to deliver breakthrough innovations for the company. In an interview with the New York Times, Dugan described ATAP as "a small, lean, and agile group that is unafraid of failure," she said, and that it will "celebrate impatience."

While at Motorola, ATAP developed and shipped several products including the Motorola Skip—part of an authentication portfolio that is also exploring digital tattoos and pills—and the augmented reality shorts, Spotlight Stories, which were featured at the 2014 Sundance Film Festival. It was there that ATAP announced the development of Project Ara, a free, open hardware platform for creating highly modular smartphones.

Additionally, in an effort to streamline research projects, foster greater collaboration with the university research community, Dugan and her deputy, Dr. Kaigham (Ken) Gabriel, negotiated the Multi-University Research Agreement with, initially, eight leading public and private universities.

=== DARPA ===
Experienced in counterterrorism and defense against explosive threats, Dugan first served as a DARPA program manager from 1996 to 2000. During her first DARPA tour, she directed a diverse $100 million portfolio of programs, including the Dog's Nose program, which focused on the development of an advanced, field-portable system for detecting the explosive content of land mines.

From July 2009 to March 2012, Dugan served as the 19th Director of DARPA and was the first woman to lead the Agency. As Director, she advanced strategic initiatives in the fields of cybersecurity, social media, and advanced manufacturing. She also led an active operational deployment in direct support of the war in Afghanistan for which the Agency was awarded the Joint Meritorious Unit Award.

== Boards ==
Dugan was appointed to the board of Hewlett Packard Enterprise in September 2022 and to the Siemens board in February 2023. She was previously appointed to the Board of Varian Medical Systems, Inc. in 2013 (NYSE: VAR), and in July 2014 she was appointed to the Board of Zynga (Nasdaq: ZNGA).

== Honors ==
- CNBC NEXT List (2014)
- Fast Company Most Creative People in Business 1000 (2014)
- CNN "Top 10 Thinkers" (2013)
- The Verge 50 (2013)
- FierceWireless "Influential Women in Wireless" (2013)
- Virginia Tech Academy of Engineering Excellence (2013)
- Washingtonian Magazine "Tech Titan" (2011)
- California State University, Fullerton presented Dugan with an honorary degree in 2011.
- Joint Meritorious Unit Award by the Secretary of Defense for "outstanding heroism during war"
- Office of the Secretary of Defense Award for Exceptional Service and the Award for Outstanding Achievement
- Bronze De Fleury Medal by the Army Engineer Regiment (2000)
- DARPA Program Manager of the Year (1999)

== Innovation ==
"Disruptive innovation is the kind that unhinges old ways of operating, juices competition and creates new growth. One of the world’s leading experts on the subject is Regina Dugan," wrote Pattie Sellers in her Postcards blog. Dugan has widely spoken and written about DARPA's non-linear style of innovation, which she brought with her to Motorola Mobility and Google.

"Regina does bring in outside perspective specifically related to projects that are leaps, versus incremental steps," Seattle-based wireless analyst Chetan Sharma recently told Technology Review.

In a New York Times article, titled "New Force Behind Agency of Wonder", John Markoff noted that Dugan is "credited with having a knack for inspiring, and indeed insisting on, creative thinking. DARPA is often discussed as a place of innovation, which was addressed during a Washington Post Live summit on U.S. Competitiveness in Washington, D.C. Talking about DARPA's innovation was likened to talking about Picasso's impressionism.

Based on their work at DARPA and then Motorola, Dugan and Gabriel co-wrote "Special Forces Innovation" for the Harvard Business Review's October 2013 issue.

Dugan partly attributes DARPA's success to an unwavering dedication to Pasteur's quadrant. The term, coined by political scientist Donald E. Stokes in his 1997 book by the same name, describes innovation that advances basic research and solves practical problems. It is contrasted with Bohr's quadrant, which seeks foundational knowledge about the world without any consideration for practical application and with Edison's quadrant in which purely practical problem solving is attempted.

== Other work ==
Dugan has delivered several keynote addresses and moderated panel discussions at events as such as:

- TED
- All Things Digital D9 and D11 conferences
- Clinton Global Initiative Annual Meeting
- Clinton Global Initiative America's Meeting
- EY Strategic Growth Forum
- FORTUNE Most Powerful Women Summit
- Qualcomm Uplinq
- Washington Post Live
- World Maker Faire

In December 2013, Dugan was appointed to the Board of Directors of Varian Medical Systems, Inc. (VAR).

== Potential conflict of interest ==
In March 2011, an article in Wired magazine stated that Dugan held stock in RedXDefense, her previous firm. In accordance with DoD policy, Dugan disclosed and recused from matters involving her former firm. A DARPA spokesperson stated that Dugan had no involvement in a 2010 contract award to RedXDefense, and that the contract was vetted by the agency's top lawyer to assure there was no conflict. Subsequently, the LA Times and Wired reported that her company had received around $1.8M in DARPA contracts and that Dugan held a promissory note from RedXDefense in the amount of $250,000. Others have argued that the Wired reporters' accusations are unjustified. In August 2011, the Inspector General of the Department of Defense(DoD) began an investigation to ensure the procedures had been followed, and to examine DARPA's general policies on conflict of interest as well as a specific concern that DARPA Director Regina Dugan retains financial ties to her former firm, which has won some $6 million in contracts with the agency, $4.3 million of which was awarded prior to her position as Director.

The Undersecretary of Defense for Acquisition, Technology, and Logistics, Ashton Carter, and the Department of Defense, General Counsel, Jeh Johnson, stated in a letter dated May 2011 addressed to Dugan, "based on what we know, we are satisfied that, given your disqualification from matters related to RedXDefense and the procedures you have put in place, there has been no violation of conflict of interest laws or regulations in the selection or funding of RedXDefense's proposals while you have been Director of DARPA".

Prior to entering the Department of Defense, potential political appointees disclose their business investments and holdings for review. Senior ethics officials in the Office of the Secretary of Defense General Counsel, Standards of Conduct Office (OSDGC, SOCO) determine what procedures are required to address potential conflicts. The procedures are designed to ensure that companies are neither favored nor disfavored and to permit talent to be attracted to government service.

Government offices
Preceded by Anthony Tether	19th Director of the Defense Advanced Research Projects Agency; 2009 – 2012	Succeeded by Arati Prabhakar
