= Stephen J. Lukasik =

American physicist (1931–2019)

Steve Lukasik
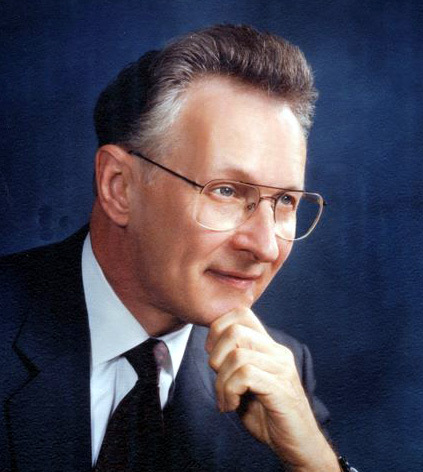
- Born: Stephen Joseph Lukasik; March 19, 1931; Staten Island, New York, U.S.
- Died: October 3, 2019 (aged 88); Fairfax, Virginia, U.S.
- Other name: Steve Lukasik
- Education: Rensselaer Polytechnic Institute (B.S., Physics, 1951), Massachusetts Institute of Technology (Ph.D., Physics, 1956)
- Known for: DARPA Director, WMD control techniques
- Spouse: Virginia Dogan Lukasik
- Awards: Department of Defense Distinguished Civilian Service Award (Jan 1973), Department of Defense Distinguished Civilian Service Award with Oak Leaf Cluster (Dec 1974), Order of National Security Merit Tong-Il Medal (June 1974)
- Scientific career
- Fields: National Defense Science R&D, Weapons of Mass Destruction control, Telecommunications
- Workplaces: MIT, BBN, Westinghouse Bettis Atomic Power Laboratory, Stevens Institute of Technology, DARPA, Xerox, RAND, FCC, Northrop, TRW, SAIC

Stephen Joseph Lukasik (March 19, 1931 – October 3, 2019) was an American physicist who served in multiple high-level defense and scientific related positions for advancing the technologies and techniques for national defense and the detection and control of diverse types of weapons of mass destruction, especially nuclear devices. He was the second longest serving Director of DARPA - the Defense Advanced Research Projects Agency – during which numerous new technologies including packet and internet protocols were developed. He was also the first chief scientist of the Federal Communications Commission where he created its Office of Science and Technology and which facilitated the commercial deployment of new technology that included spread spectrum technology.

== Life and career ==
Lukasik was born on Staten Island, New York, to Mildred (Tynan) and Stephen Joseph Lukasik. He was of Polish, German, French, English, and Irish descent. During high school, he gravitated to physics, and after seeing the newspaper reports on August 8, 1945 of the Hiroshima weapon, he became focused on nuclear weapon controls for much of the rest of his life. He went to Rensselaer Polytechnic Institute where he received a B.S. in physics 1951, and then the Massachusetts Institute of Technology to graduate five years later with a Ph.D. in physics. His thesis was supervised by William Allis and treated a subatomic phenomenon. While a graduate student at MIT, he worked at nearby BBN Technologies security-related wave phenomenon as an acoustical engineer.

After graduating MIT, Lukasik joined Westinghouse Bettis Atomic Laboratory as a scientist, refining criticality codes. In 1957, he went to Stevens Institute of Technology Davidson Laboratory, where he established a Fluid Physics Division which pioneered techniques such as explosive compression of magnetic flux to produce megagauss-level magnetic fields, sweeping pressure sensitive naval mines, and examining energy loss mechanisms acting on shallow water waves. He also taught as an associate research professor in physics, and served as director of the Stevens Computer Center. In 1961, he consulted on a balloon-borne nuclear test detection system at Vitro Corporation.

The nuclear device detection work led in 1966 to Dr. Lukasik joining the Advanced Research Projects Agency (ARPA) as Director of Nuclear Test Detection and the development of verification techniques to support nuclear test ban negotiations. The Norwegian Large Aperture Seismic Array among others were developed as part of a network for detection of underground nuclear detonations. New work to understand how test ban treaties could be circumvented became important, and was a basis for evaluating new treaty proposals such as the Threshold Nuclear Test Ban Treaty signed in July 1974.

Lukasik became ARPA's deputy director in 1967 and director in 1970 until 1975. The period was marked by major new technologies and transferring results of ARPA research into deployed DOD and civilian systems. The new work included ARPANET expansion and Internet protocols. Other important national security technologies were smart weapons, anti-submarine warfare capabilities using long towed acoustic arrays, artificial intelligence, speech understanding, unmanned aerial vehicle, and defense aid for of U.S. allies. In cooperation with the Defense Nuclear Agency, a long-range research planning Program in 1973 that guided the introduction of ARPA research programs for the next thirty years, and included network-centric warfare, stealth technology, precision and autonomous systems, and theater missile defenses. The efforts were facilitated by creating the classified Journal of Defense Research on Tactical Warfare. Research on the adverse climate effects of nuclear explosions earthmoving applications helped to discourage USSR use. Increased use of email for long-distance collaboration was newly introduced.

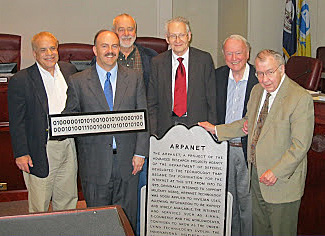
Ceremony on 17 May 2011 at the Arlington County, Virginia Board to affix a plaque at DARPA headquarters commemorating the development of the ARAPANET. The binary sign spells out "ARPANET." Lukasik is in the middle of this picture, surrounded by former colleagues and Arlington County Virginia officials.

Lukasik left DARPA for the Xerox Corporation in 1975, organizing its Network Systems Development Division to undertake research moved from Xerox's Palo Alto Research Center (PARC) to create an architecturally compatible line of electronic office system products for local area networks. These products included new technologies at the time such as Ethernet, the ALTO personal computer, the Smalltalk language, and laser printing. Three years later, he became RAND Corporation's vice president for national security programs and chief scientist. He also taught technology and public policy in the RAND Graduate Institute and helped create the Information Society Journal.

The Federal Communications Commission's new chairman, Charlie Ferris, brought in Lukasik to become its first chief scientist in 1979 and restructure its technical resources to form the Office of Science and Technology. While at the FCC, he facilitated the authorization of first direct broadcast satellites and also in the initiation of the Docket 81-413 rulemaking that would ultimately lead to the 1985 adoptions of unlicensed ISM band rules that are the foundation of Wi-Fi, Bluetooth, and many other products. He also introduced strategic technology planning into the FCC. The work also included examining the potential health effects of electromagnetic radiation from communication systems.

During Lukasik's years of public service as DARPA's director and as FCC's chief scientist, he appeared more than two dozen times before Congressional National Security and Scientific Committees. The testimony included a broad array of topics including the funding and programs of the agency activities under his responsibility, as well as treatment of specialized topics such as the Comprehensive Test Ban Treaty and new telecommunication technologies.

In 1982, Lukasik returned to the West Coast to become a Northrop VP and director of the Northrop Research and Technology Center. Significant new national security technologies were developed at the Center that included MEMS acceleration sensors and ring laser gyroscopes for smart weapons, incorporation of advanced information technology into high performance fighter aircraft, and stealth technology for the B–2 bomber. An Air Force Systems Command initiative on complex software systems managed using systematic software engineering processes was also implemented. In 1990, became TRW's Vice President of Technology for the Space and Defense Sector - which undertook defense conversion efforts following collapse of the USSR.

In 1992, Lukasik became assistant to Science Applications International Corporation (SAIC) CEO (Bob) Beyster – to help with many of the company's important civilian and defense initiatives that included Transportation Sector work on Intelligent Vehicle-Highway Systems, transfer of DoD modeling and simulation technology to the entertainment industry, third world nuclear deterrence strategy, and pursuing ways to interdict weapons of mass destruction carried in commercial transportation channels. Following the 2001 attacks, Lukasik worked with the SAIC subsidiary Hicks & Associates on terrorism information awareness and as leader of red teams to establish responses to potential terrorist attacks and public spokesperson.

During the past decade, Lukasik became a Distinguished Senior Research Fellow at Georgia Tech's Sam Nunn School of International Affairs and its treatment of infrastructure protection, as well as cyberconflict and cyberdeterrence. He has continued to lead efforts to capture the history of the national security science sector. As recently noted by the Charles Babbage Institute, Lukasik's "career – begun in 1952 and continuing to this day – represents incredible contributions to the multifaceted field of national security." Throughout his career, he advocated a focus on the grand challenges being faced by the agency or company.

== Awards and honors ==
Lukasik was awarded the Department of Defense Distinguished Civilian Service Award and Medal twice - initially in January 1973 by Secretary of Defense Melvin Laird, and again in December 1974 by Secretary of Defense James Schlesinger. The second award included an Oak Leaf Cluster. As shown in the accompanying citation, the award was given for multiple major achievements as DARPA Director including "significantly broadening the scope of relevant activities conducted under the aegis of the Defense Advanced Research Projects Agency."

In June 1974, the Republic of Korea awarded him the Order of National Security Merit Tong-Il Medal for assistance provided in founding the South Korea's Agency for Defense Development.

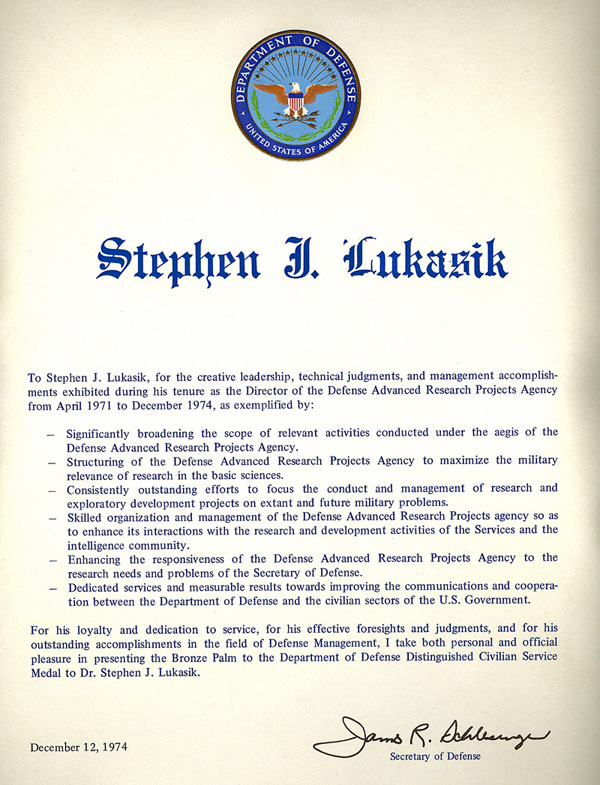
Lukasik's December 1974 DOD Distinguished Civilian Service Award citation.

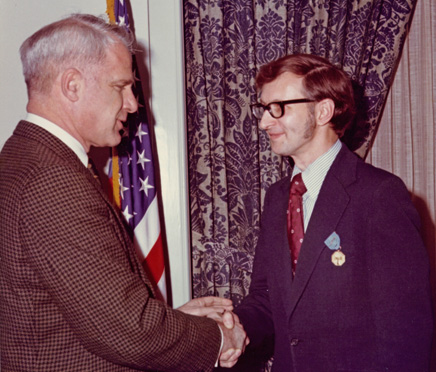
Lukasik receiving the Department of Defense Distinguished Civilian Service Award Medal with Oak Leaf Cluster from Secretary of Defense James R. Schlesinger, 12 December 1974.

== Appointments to federal and academic committees and honorary degrees ==
Lukasik held positions on numerous Federal and academic committees shaping national security technology policies and R&D.

Federal national security and scientific committees

- Joint US–UK Working Group on Nuclear Test Detection (Chair, 1966–1970)
- Editorial board, Journal of Defense Research (1972–1977)
- Defense Intelligence Agency Advisory Board (1975–1982), (Vice-chair 1976–1980)
- Center for Naval Analyses Board of Overseers (1975–1977)
- Defense Science Board and Task Forces (1975–1991)
- Director for Central Intelligence Science and Technology Advisory Panel (1976–1992) (Chairman (1976– 1979, 1984–1989)
- National Science Foundation Science Applications Task Force (1976–1977)
- U.S. Army West Point Study Group Academic Subcommittee (1977)
- Office of Technology Assessment Verification Technologies for a START Agreement Advisory Panel (1977–1979)
- Joint Strategic Targeting Planning Staff Strategic Advisory Group (1978–1992)
- National Research Council Advisory Panels and Committees (1986–2001)
- Chief of Naval Operations Executive Panel (1988–1992)
- National Security Agency Scientific Advisory Board and Advanced Technology Panel (1990–1992)

Academic institution appointments and degrees

- Visiting scholar at the Stanford University Center for International Security and Cooperation] (1998) including the Consortium for Research on Information Security and Policy (CRISP) and the Lawrence Livermore National Laboratory contribution to President's Commission on Critical Infrastructure Protection.
- Distinguished senior research fellow at the Georgia Institute of Technology, Sam Nunn School of International Affairs (2007–present)
- Trustee, Stevens Institute of Technology Board of Trustees (1975–1987)
- Trustee, Harvey Mudd College Board of Trustees (1987–2005), Emeritus Trustee
- Member, Computer Science and Communication Advisory Committees at the University of California Berkeley, Stanford University, University of Southern California, and George Washington University
- Honorary Doctorate of Engineering, Stevens Institute of Technology

== Patents awarded ==
Lukasik was awarded two patents in 2012 and 2013 for his inventions related to chemical warfare sensors and increasing signal-to-noise ratio using nanotechnology.

== Articles, presentations, and papers ==
During Lukasik's more than sixty years activity in diverse positions, he authored hundreds of articles, presentations, books and papers. Some of the more significant ones over the past 25 years are included below.

- “Protecting Users of the Cyber Commons,” Communications of the ACM, Vol. 54, No. 9, Sept 2011.
- “Why the ARPANET Was Built,” IEEE Annals of the History of Computing, Mar. 2011.
- “A framework for thinking about cyber conflict and cyber deterrence, with possible declaratory policies for these domains,” Proc. Workshop Deterring CyberAttacks: Informing Strategies and Developing Options for US Policy, (2010, July 22), Nat'l Academies Press, 2010, pp. 99–122.
- "Deterring the use of cyber force," Center for International Strategy, Technology, and Policy, The Sam Nunn School of International Affairs Georgia Institute of Technology, Atlanta, Georgia, 10 Dec 2009 (with Rebecca Givener-Forbes).
- “Possibilities for Next-Generation WMD and WME Terrorism,” SAIC report for DTRA, Sep 06.
- “Combating Cyber Burglary: The Case of Titan Rain,” Hicks & Associates, Inc., report for the Office of the Secretary of Defense, September 2005.
- “Mapping the Landscape of Cyber Attacks,” H&AI report for the Office of the Secretary of Defense, 8 August 2005.
- “Final Summary Report of the DARPA TIA Red Team,” Hicks & Associates, Inc., 26 September 2003.
- “Vulnerabilities and Failures of Complex Systems,” International Journal of Engineering Education, 19, No. 1, 206–212, (2003).
- “Protecting Critical Infrastructures Against Cyber-Attack,” Adelphi Paper 359, International Institute for Strategic Studies, Oxford University Press, August 2003, London (with Seymour Goodman and David Longhurst).
- “A Proposal for an International Convention on Cyber Crime and Terrorism,” Stanford University Center for International Security and Arms Control, August 2000 (with Abraham Sofaer et al.).
- “Cyber-attacks, Counter-attacks, and International Law,” Survival, 42, pp 89–103, International Institute for Strategic Studies, London, Autumn 2000 (with Gregory D. Grove and Seymour Goodman).
- “Review and Analysis of the Report of The President’s Commission on Critical Infrastructure Protection,” Stanford University Center for International Security and Arms Control, January 1998.
- “Public and Private Roles in the Protection of Critical Information-Dependent Infrastructure,” Stanford University Center for International Security and Arms Control, May 1997.
- "The Transnational Dimension of Cyber Crime and Terrorism," Ed. Abraham Sofaer and Seymour Goodman, Chapter 4 Current and Future Technical Capabilities, Hoover Institution Press, Publication No. 490, Stanford, CA, (2001).
- “DARPA,” Vol. 5, Encyclopedia of Telecommunications, Marcel Dekker, Inc., New York, N.Y., 1992.
