= Proto 2 =

DARPA innovation initiative

Proto 2 is the name of the $55 million initiative of the Defense Advanced Research Projects Agency, or DARPA, to create a thought-controlled prosthetic arm. Its predecessor was called Proto 1 and was capable of reasonably complicated movements like rolling the shoulders, wrists, flexing the fingers. etc.

Proto 2 is a critical milestone of thought-controlled mechanical arms. It is complete with hand and articulated fingers that can perform 25 joint motions. This dexterity approaches that of a real arm (which makes about 30 motions) — a great improvement over the Proto 1. A person wearing a Proto 2 could "conceivably play the piano".

The next steps are to shrink the battery, develop more-efficient motors, and refine the bulky electrodes used to read electrical signals in muscles.

== How it works ==
- Control System

Researchers are experimenting with injectable myoelectric sensors (IMES) that detect muscle activity and wirelessly transmit commands to the prosthetic arm- in order to eliminate the bulkiness. A wire coil wrapped over the shoulder supplies wireless power to the implants and relays signals to computers in the prosthetic that decipher the command and tell the arm to move. The team is also considering implanting electrodes directly on nerves.

- Power

Researchers are exploring a hydrogen-peroxide pneumatic system to replace electric motors, which are bulky, slow and weak. The hydrogen peroxide reacts with an iridium catalyst to drive the arm's movements. The wearer would install a fresh hydrogen-peroxide canister each morning.

- Flexibility

The Proto 2 performs 25 joint motions: The shoulder and wrist are capable of roll, pitch and yaw, the elbow can flex, and the fingers and thumbs bend at each knuckle. Each joint brings together two lightweight "bones" made of carbon fiber and aluminum alloys.

- Building blocks

Modular construction—shoulder to elbow, elbow to wrist—allows doctors to adapt the limb to patients' needs.

== Status ==
Researchers hoped for it to be accepted for clinical trials by 2009.

== See also ==
- Prosthetic
- Bionics
- Brain-computer interface
- Myoelectric prosthesis
