= USX-1 Defiant =

American unmanned surface vessel

History

United States
- Builder: Nichols Brothers Boat Builders; Serco Maritime
- Christened: 11 August 2025

General characteristics
- Displacement: 240 metric tons
- Length: 180 feet (55 m)
- Speed: 20 kts
- Complement: 0

The USX-1 Defiant is a unmanned warship built as a demonstration project by the Defense Advanced Research Projects Agency (DARPA) and completed in February 2025 and began sea trials in following month. It was first seen in public in March 2025 near the U.S. Navy's Naval Air Station (NAS) Whidbey Island. The ship has an LOA (length overall) of 180 feet with a 240 metric ton displacement. Defence Shipbuilder Serco oversaw the project.

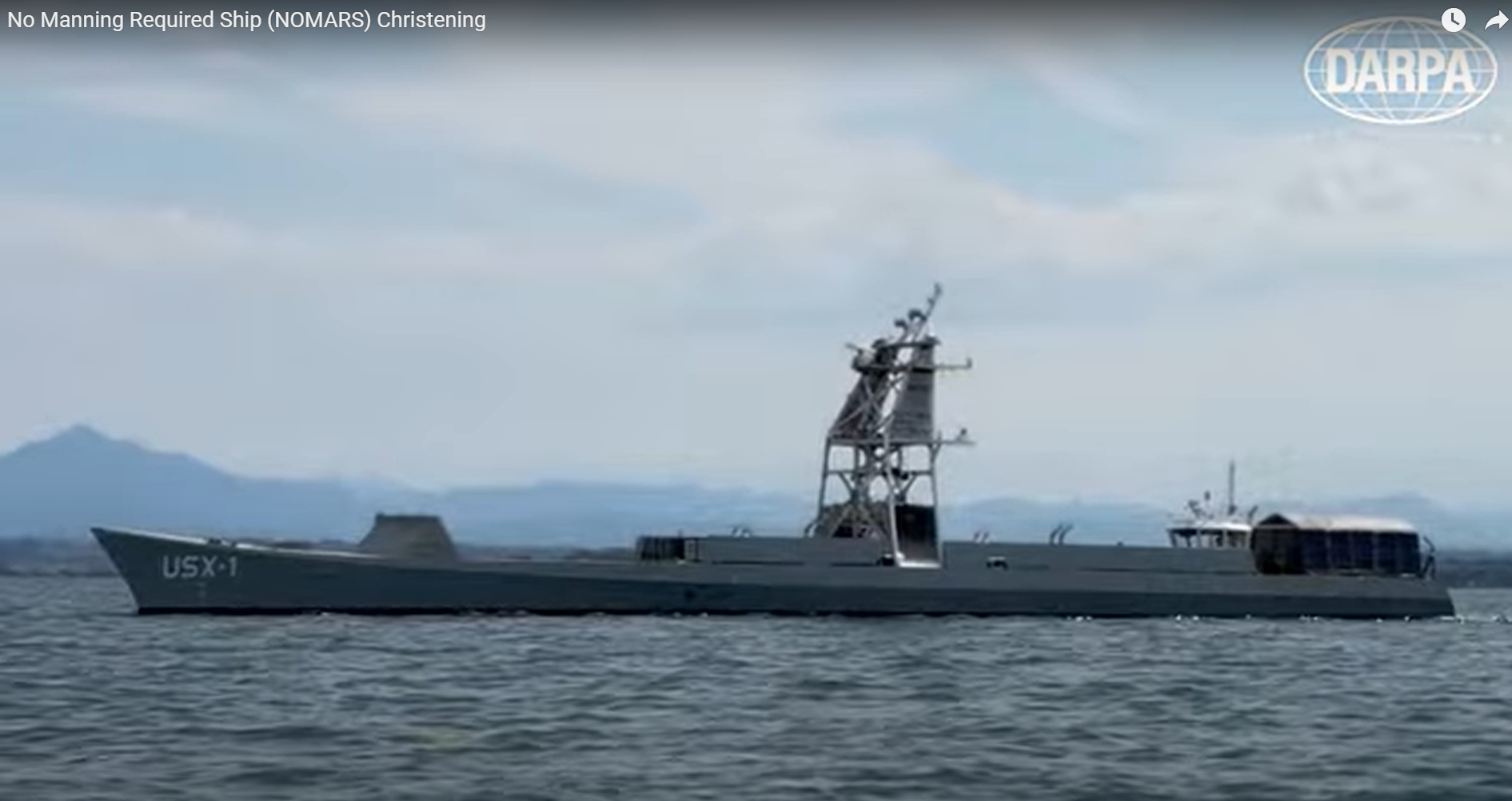
USX-1 Defiant shortly after launching

During sea trials at Port Hueneme, California, the NOMARS validated capabilities of the Defiant, including successful demonstration of automated at-sea fueling. The USX-1 Defiant also tested high-speed turns and speed tests at up to 20 knots. Defiant also achieved automated dockings, undockings and harbor entry and exit.
