= Defense Sciences Office =

The Defense Sciences Office (DSO) is one of seven technical offices within DARPA, an agency of the U.S. Department of Defense that is responsible for the development of advanced technology for national security. In a 2021 news story, DARPA described it "a highly exploratory office that identifies and accelerates new technologies."

DARPA created DSO in 1980 by merging several projects that had separately been working on materials science, cybernetic technology, and nuclear monitoring. DARPA later spun off two of DSO's areas into groups of their own: Microsystems Technology Office (1992) and the Biological Technologies Office (2014).
