= DySPAN =

Standards committee, develops standards for radio and spectrum management

The Dynamic Spectrum Access Networks Standards Committee (DySPAN-SC), formerly Standards Coordinating Committee 41 (SCC41), and even earlier the IEEE P1900 Standards Committee, is sponsored by the Institute of Electrical and Electronics Engineers (IEEE). The group develops standards for radio and spectrum management. Its working groups and resulting standards, numbered in the 1900 range, are sometimes referred to as IEEE 1900.X.

== Background ==
The IEEE P1900 Standards Committee was established in March 2005 jointly by the IEEE Communications Society (ComSoc) and the IEEE Electromagnetic Compatibility Society (EMC). The effort developed supporting standards for radio and dynamic spectrum management.

On March 22, 2007, the IEEE Standards Board approved its reorganization as Standards Coordinating Committee 41 (SCC41), Dynamic Spectrum Access Networks (DySPAN). The IEEE ComSoc and EMC sponsored this effort, as they did for IEEE 1900. The IEEE 1900 Committee ceased to exist at the inaugural meeting of SCC41 in April 2007. The work of the IEEE 1900.x Working Groups continued under SCC41. SCC41 voted to be directly answerable to ComSoc in December 2010, and was renamed as IEEE DySPAN-SC. At its December 2010 Meeting, the IEEE Standards Association Standards Board (SASB) approved the transfer of projects to the Communications Society Standards Board.

== Overview ==
DySPAN-SC focuses on Dynamic Spectrum Access and associated technologies. Due to the strong inter-relationships between such topics, it also touches on other areas such as Cognitive Radio.

== Working groups ==
IEEE DySPAN-SC currently oversees the following standards development working groups:

1. 1900.1 Working Group on Terminology and Concepts for Next Generation Radio Systems and Spectrum Management
2. 1900.2 Working Group on Recommended Practice for Interference and Coexistence Analysis
3. 1900.3 Working Group on Recommended Practice for Conformance Evaluation of Software Defined Radio (SDR) Software Modules
4. 1900.4 Working Group on Architectural Building Blocks Enabling Network-Device Distributed Decision Making for Optimized Radio Resource Usage in Heterogeneous Wireless Access Networks
5. 1900.5 Working Group on Policy Language and Policy Architectures for Managing Cognitive Radio for Dynamic Spectrum Access Applications
6. 1900.6 Working Group on Spectrum Sensing Interfaces and Data Structures for Dynamic Spectrum Access and other Advanced Radio Communication Systems
7. P1900.7 Working Group on Radio Interface for White Space Dynamic Spectrum Access Radio Systems Supporting Fixed and Mobile Operation

Proposed standards have "P" prepended to the name until they are ratified. The first to be published was 1900.2 in July 2008. Next was 1900.1 on September 26, 2008. Then 1900.4 was published on February 27, 2009. Work then began on amendment P1900.4.1a for dynamic spectrum access networks in white space frequency bands, and P1900.4.1 for interoperability between components of the IEEE 1900.4 system. The 1900.6 standard was published on April 22, 2011, and work began on an amendment 1900.6a.

=== IEEE 1900.4 ===
The IEEE 1900.4 Working Group is on "Architectural Building Blocks Enabling Network-Device Distributed Decision Making for Optimized Radio Resource Usage in Heterogeneous Wireless Access Networks" It is a working group under the IEEE SCC41.

IEEE 1900.4 was published on February 27, 2009.

There are two projects for the 1900.4 Working Group starting April 2009:

- 1900.4a: Standard for Architectural Building Blocks Enabling Network-Device Distributed Decision Making for Optimized Radio Resource Usage in Heterogeneous Wireless Access Networks – Amendment: Architecture and Interfaces for Dynamic Spectrum Access Networks in White Space Frequency Bands
- 1900.4.1: Standard for Interfaces and Protocols Enabling Distributed Decision Making for Optimized Radio Resource Usage in Heterogeneous Wireless Networks

==== Standard Overview ====
Use cases (cases in which the protocols described by this standard will be used) include:

- Dynamic spectrum assignment
- Dynamic spectrum sharing
- Distributed radio resource usage optimization

==== History ====
The protocol was first popularized by various articles, including one on Monday, March 23, 2009.

== See also ==
- IEEE 802.22 standard for Wireless Regional Area Network
- Software-defined radio
- Cognitive radio
- Open spectrum
