= DARPA =

Technology research and development agency of the U.S. Department of Defense

Defense Advanced Research Projects Agency
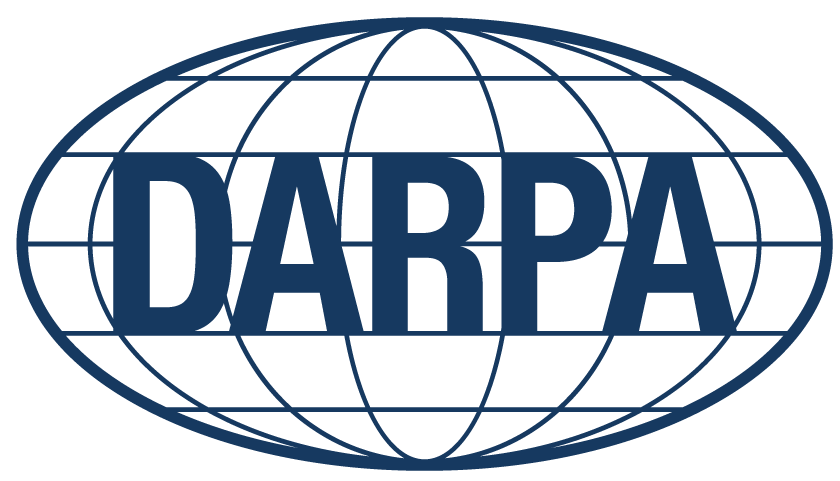
- Logo of the Defense Advanced Research Projects Agency

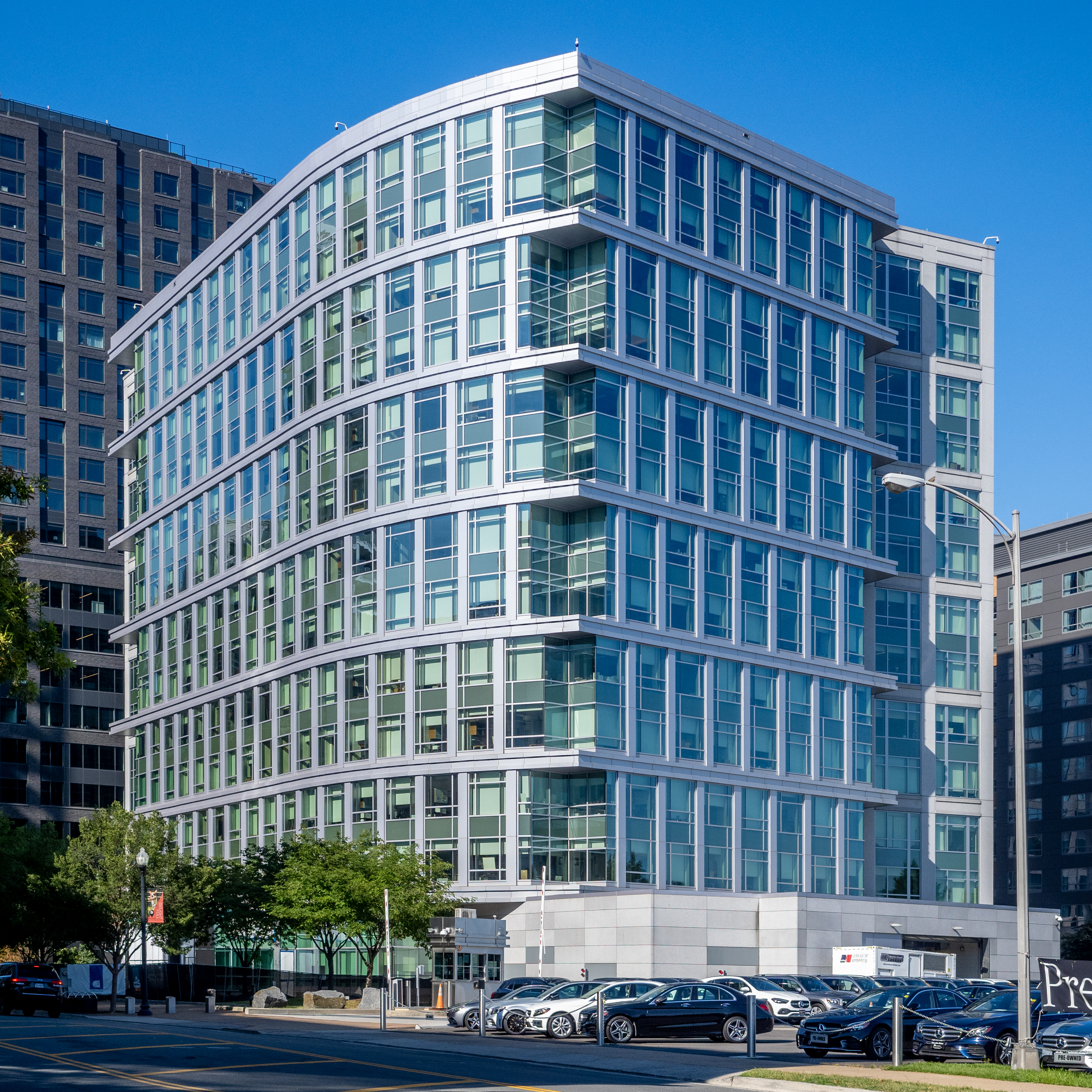
- Headquarters in Ballston in Arlington County, Virginia, in 2022

Agency overview
- Formed: February 7, 1958; 68 years ago (as ARPA)
- Preceding agency: Advanced Research Projects Agency
- Jurisdiction: Federal government of the United States
- Headquarters: 675 North Randolph St., Ballston, Virginia, U.S.; 38.8788°N 77.1088°W
- Employees: 1,122 (2026)
- Annual budget: $4.322 billion (FY2026)
- Agency executive: Stephen Winchell, Director
- Parent department: United States Department of Defense
- Website: www.darpa.mil

The Defense Advanced Research Projects Agency (DARPA) is a research and development agency of the United States Department of Defense responsible for the development of emerging technologies for use by the military. Originally known as the Advanced Research Projects Agency (ARPA), the agency was created on February 7, 1958, by President Dwight D. Eisenhower in response to the Soviets' launch of Sputnik 1 in 1957. By collaborating with academia, industry, and government partners, DARPA formulates and executes research and development projects to expand the frontiers of technology and science, often beyond immediate U.S. military requirements. The name of the organization was first changed from its founding name, ARPA, to DARPA, in March 1972, changing back to ARPA in February 1993, and then back again to DARPA in March 1996.

The Economist has called DARPA "the agency that shaped the modern world", with technologies such as "Moderna's COVID-19 vaccine ... weather satellites, GPS, drones, stealth technology, voice interfaces, the personal computer, and the internet on the list of innovations for which DARPA can claim at least partial credit". Its track record of success has inspired governments around the world to launch similar research and development agencies.

DARPA is independent of other military research and development and reports directly to senior Department of Defense management. As of 2026, DARPA comprises about 1,122 government employees in six technical offices, including nearly 100 program managers, who together oversee about 250 research and development programs. Stephen Winchell is the current director, since May 2025.

== History ==
A video showing DARPA's achievements from its first 50 years

=== Early history (1958–1969) ===
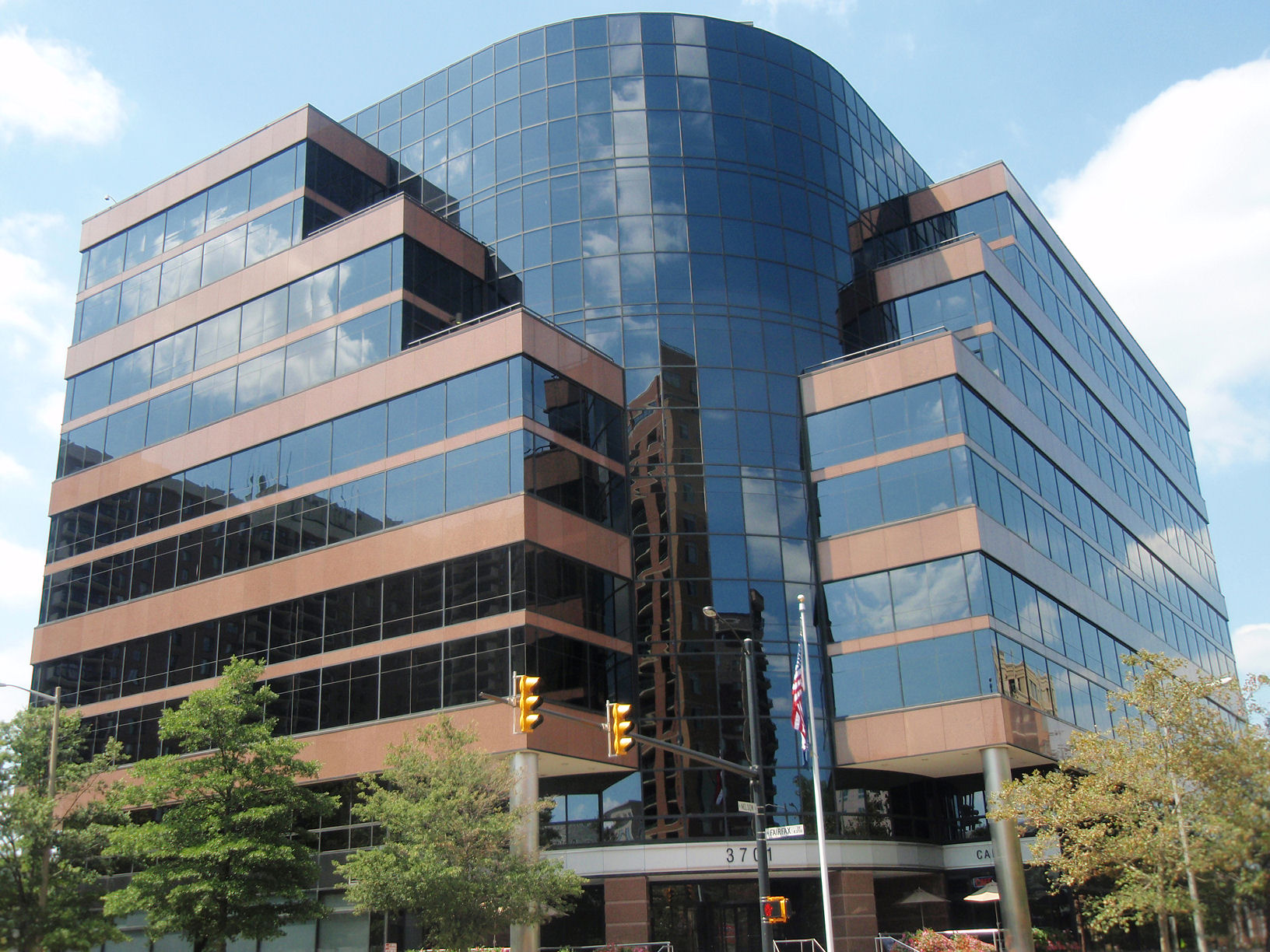
DARPA's former headquarters in the Virginia Square neighborhood of Arlington County, Virginia. The agency is currently located in a new building at 675 North Randolph St.

The Advanced Research Projects Agency (ARPA) was suggested by the President's Scientific Advisory Committee to President Dwight D. Eisenhower in a meeting called after the launch of Sputnik. ARPA was formally authorized by President Eisenhower in 1958 for the purpose of forming and executing research and development projects to expand the frontiers of technology and science and be able to reach far beyond immediate military requirements. The two relevant acts are the Supplemental Military Construction Authorization (Air Force) (Public Law 85-325) and Department of Defense Directive 5105.15, in February 1958. It was placed within the Office of the Secretary of Defense (OSD) and counted roughly 150 people. Its creation was directly attributed to the launching of Sputnik and to U.S. realization that the Soviet Union had developed the capacity to rapidly exploit military technology. Initial funding of ARPA was $520 million. ARPA's first director, Roy Johnson, left a $160,000 management job at General Electric for an $18,000 job at ARPA. Herbert York from Lawrence Livermore National Laboratory was hired as his scientific assistant.

Johnson and York were both keen on space projects, but when NASA was established later in 1958, all space projects and most of ARPA's funding were transferred to it. Johnson resigned and ARPA was repurposed to do "high-risk", "high-gain", and "far out" basic research, a posture that was enthusiastically embraced by the nation's scientists and research universities. ARPA's second director was Brigadier General Austin W. Betts, who resigned in early 1961 and was succeeded by Jack Ruina who served until 1963. Ruina, the first scientist to administer ARPA, managed to raise its budget to $250 million. It was Ruina who hired J. C. R. Licklider as the first administrator of the Information Processing Techniques Office, which played a vital role in creation of ARPANET, the basis for the future Internet.

Additionally, the political and defense communities recognized the need for a high-level Department of Defense organization to formulate and execute R&D projects that would expand the frontiers of technology beyond the immediate and specific requirements of the Military Services and their laboratories. In pursuit of this mission, DARPA has developed and transferred technology programs encompassing a wide range of scientific disciplines that address the full spectrum of national security needs.

From 1958 to 1965, ARPA's emphasis centered on major national issues, including space, ballistic missile defense, and nuclear test detection. During 1960, all of its civilian space programs were transferred to the National Aeronautics and Space Administration (NASA) and the military space programs to the individual services.

This allowed ARPA to concentrate its efforts on Project Defender (ballistic missile defense), Project Vela (nuclear test detection), and Project Agile (counterinsurgency R&D programs), and to begin work on computer processing, behavioral sciences, and materials sciences. The DEFENDER and AGILE programs formed the foundation of DARPA sensor, surveillance, and directed energy R&D, particularly in the study of radar, infrared sensing, and x-ray/gamma ray detection.

ARPA at this point (1959) played an early role in Transit (also called NavSat) a predecessor to the Global Positioning System (GPS). "Fast-forward to 1959 when a joint effort between DARPA and the Johns Hopkins Applied Physics Laboratory began to fine-tune the early explorers' discoveries. TRANSIT, sponsored by the Navy and developed under the leadership of Richard Kirschner at Johns Hopkins, was the first satellite positioning system."

During the late 1960s, with the transfer of these mature programs to the Services, ARPA redefined its role and concentrated on a diverse set of relatively small, essentially exploratory research programs. The agency was renamed the Defense Advanced Research Projects Agency (DARPA) in 1972, and during the early 1970s, it emphasized direct energy programs, information processing, and tactical technologies.

Concerning information processing, DARPA made great progress, initially through its support of the development of time-sharing. All modern operating systems rely on concepts invented for the Multics system, developed by a cooperation among Bell Labs, General Electric and MIT, which DARPA supported by funding Project MAC at MIT with an initial two-million-dollar grant.

DARPA supported the evolution of the ARPANET (the first wide-area packet switching network), The Packet Radio Network, Packet Satellite Network, and ultimately the Internet and research into the artificial intelligence fields of speech recognition and signal processing, including parts of Shakey the robot. DARPA also supported the early development of both hypertext and hypermedia. DARPA funded one of the first two hypertext systems, Douglas Engelbart's NLS computer system, as well as The Mother of All Demos. DARPA later funded the development of the Aspen Movie Map, which is generally seen as the first hypermedia system and an important precursor of virtual reality.

=== Later history (1970–1980) ===
The Mansfield Amendment of 1973 expressly limited appropriations for defense research (through DARPA) only to projects with direct military application.

The resulting "brain drain" is credited with boosting the development of the fledgling personal computer industry. Some young computer scientists left the universities to startups and private research laboratories such as Xerox PARC.

Between 1976 and 1981, DARPA's major projects were dominated by air, land, sea, and space technology, tactical armor and anti-armor programs, infrared sensing for space-based surveillance, high-energy laser technology for space-based missile defense, antisubmarine warfare, advanced cruise missiles, advanced aircraft, and defense applications of advanced computing.

Many of the successful programs were transitioned to the Services, such as the foundation technologies in automatic target recognition, space-based sensing, propulsion, and materials that were transferred to the Strategic Defense Initiative Organization (SDIO), later known as the Ballistic Missile Defense Organization (BMDO), now titled the Missile Defense Agency (MDA).

=== Recent history (1981–present) ===
During the 1980s, the attention of the Agency was centered on information processing and aircraft-related programs, including the National Aerospace Plane (NASP) or Hypersonic Research Program. The Strategic Computing Program enabled DARPA to exploit advanced processing and networking technologies and to rebuild and strengthen relationships with universities after the Vietnam War. In addition, DARPA began to pursue new concepts for small, lightweight satellites (LIGHTSAT) and directed new programs regarding defense manufacturing, submarine technology, and armor/anti-armor.

In 1981, two engineers, Robert McGhee and Kenneth Waldron, started to develop the Adaptive Suspension Vehicle (ASV) nicknamed the "Walker" at the Ohio State University, under a research contract from DARPA. The vehicle was 17 feet long, 8 feet wide, and 10.5 feet high, and had six legs to support its three-ton aluminum body, in which it was designed to carry cargo over difficult terrains. However, DARPA lost interest in the ASV, after problems with cold-weather tests.

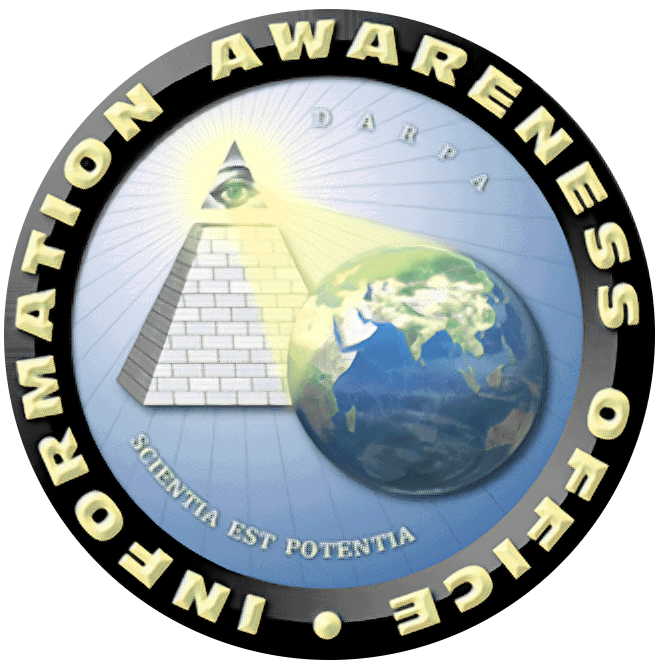
Logo of DARPA's Information Awareness Office, a 2001 program to build vast and warrantless databases of Americans' personal data.

In 2001, DARPA established the Information Awareness Office (IAO) with the stated mission of applying surveillance technology to target terrorists and other threats through "Total Information Awareness". This consisted of creating enormous computer databases to gather and store the personal information of everyone in the United States, including personal e-mails, social networks, credit card records, phone calls, medical records, and numerous other sources, without any requirement for a search warrant. In 2003, following public criticism that this would lead to a mass surveillance system, the IAO was defunded by Congress, but several IAO projects persisted under different names until revealed by Edward Snowden in the 2013 mass surveillance disclosures.

On February 4, 2004, the agency shut down its so called "LifeLog Project". The project's aim would have been, "To gather in a single place just about everything an individual says, sees or does".

On October 28, 2009, the agency broke ground on a new facility in Arlington County, Virginia a few miles from The Pentagon.

In fall 2011, DARPA hosted the 100-Year Starship Symposium with the aim of getting the public to start thinking seriously about interstellar travel.

On June 5, 2016, NASA and DARPA announced that it planned to build new X-planes with NASA's plan setting to create a whole series of X-planes over the next 10 years.

Between 2014 and 2016, DARPA shepherded the first machine-to-machine computer security competition, The Cyber Grand Challenge (CGC), bringing a group of top-notch computer security experts to search for security vulnerabilities, exploit them, and create fixes that patch those vulnerabilities in a fully automated fashion. It is one of DARPA prize competitions to spur innovations.

In June 2018, DARPA leaders demonstrated a number of new technologies that were developed within the framework of the GXV-T program. The goal of this program is to create a lightly armored combat vehicle of not very large dimensions, which, due to maneuverability and other tricks, can successfully resist modern anti-tank weapon systems.

In September 2020, DARPA and the US Air Force announced that the Hypersonic Air-breathing Weapon Concept (HAWC) are ready for free-flight tests within the next year.

Victoria Coleman became the director of DARPA in November 2020.

In recent years, DARPA officials have contracted out core functions to corporations. For example, during fiscal year 2020, Chenega ran physical security on DARPA's premises, System High Corp. carried out program security, and Agile Defense ran unclassified IT services. General Dynamics runs classified IT services. Strategic Analysis Inc. provided support services regarding engineering, science, mathematics, front office and administrative work.

DARPA history

The Formative Years
(1958–1975)

The Cold War Era
(1975–1989)

The Post-Soviet Years
(1989–2008)

== Organization ==
=== Current program offices ===
DARPA has six technical offices that manage the agency's research portfolio, and two additional offices that manage special projects. All offices report to the DARPA director, including:

- The Defense Sciences Office (DSO) identifies and pursues high-risk, high-payoff research initiatives across a broad spectrum of science and engineering disciplines and transforms them into important, new game-changing technologies for U.S. national security. Current DSO themes include novel materials and structures, sensing and measurement, computation and processing, enabling operations, collective intelligence, and global change.
- The Information Innovation Office (I2O) aims to ensure U.S. technological superiority in all areas where information can provide a decisive military advantage.
- The Microsystems Technology Office (MTO) core mission is the development of high-performance, intelligent microsystems and next-generation components to ensure U.S. dominance in Command, Control, Communications, Computer, Intelligence, Surveillance, and Reconnaissance (C4ISR), Electronic Warfare (EW), and Directed Energy (DE). The effectiveness, survivability, and lethality of systems that relate to these applications depend critically on microsystems and components.
- The Strategic Technology Office (STO) mission is to focus on technologies that have a global theater-wide impact and that involve multiple Services.
- The Tactical Technology Office (TTO) engages in high-risk, high-payoff advanced military research, emphasizing the "system" and "subsystem" approach to the development of aeronautic, space, and land systems as well as embedded processors and control systems
- The Biological Technologies Office (BTO) fosters, demonstrates, and transitions breakthrough fundamental research, discoveries, and applications that integrate biology, engineering, and computer science for national security. Created in April 2014 by then Director Arati Prabhakar, taking programs from the MTO and DSO offices.

=== Former offices ===
- The Adaptive Execution Office (AEO) was created in 2009 by the DARPA Director, Regina Dugan. The office's four project areas included technology transition, assessment, rapid productivity and adaptive systems. AEO provided the agency with robust connections to the soldier community and assisted the agency with the planning and execution of technology demonstrations and field trials to promote adoption by soldiers, accelerating the transition of new technologies into DoD capabilities.
- Information Awareness Office: 2002–2003
- The Advanced Technology Office (ATO) researched, demonstrated, and developed high payoff projects in maritime communications, special operations, command and control, information assurance and survivability mission areas.
- The Special Projects Office (SPO) researched, developed, demonstrated, and transitioned technologies focused on addressing present and emerging national challenges. SPO investments ranged from the development of enabling technologies to the demonstration of large prototype systems. SPO developed technologies to counter the emerging threat of underground facilities used for purposes ranging from command-and-control, to weapons storage and staging, to the manufacture of weapons of mass destruction. SPO developed significantly more cost-effective ways to counter proliferated, inexpensive cruise missiles, UAVs, other platforms used for weapon delivery, jamming, and surveillance. SPO invested in novel space technologies across the spectrum of space control applications including rapid access, space situational awareness, counterspace, and persistent tactical grade sensing approaches including extremely large space apertures and structures.
- The Office of Special Development (OSD) in the 1960s developed a real-time remote sensing, monitoring, and predictive activity system on trails used by insurgents in Laos, Cambodia, and Vietnam. This was done from an office in Bangkok, Thailand, that was ostensibly established to catalog and support the Thai fishing fleet, of which two volumes were published. This is a personal recollection without a published citation. A report on the ARPA group under which OSD operated is found here.

A 1991 reorganization created several offices which existed throughout the early 1990s:

- The Electronic Systems Technology Office combined areas of the Defense Sciences Office and the Defense Manufacturing Office. The new office focused on the boundary between general-purpose computers and the physical world, such as sensors, displays, and the first few layers of specialized signal-processing that couple these modules to standard computer interfaces.
- The Software and Intelligent Systems Technology Office and the Computing Systems office had the responsibility associated with the Presidential High-Performance Computing Initiative. The Software office was also responsible for "software systems technology, machine intelligence and software engineering."
- The Land Systems Office was created to develop advanced land vehicle and anti-armor systems, once the domain of the Tactical Technology Office.
- The Undersea Warfare Office combined areas of the Advanced Vehicle Systems and Tactical Technology offices to develop and demonstrate submarine stealth, counter-stealth and automation.

A 2010 reorganization merged two offices:

- The Transformational Convergence Technology Office (TCTO) and the Information Processing Techniques Office (IPTO) were combined in 2010 to form the Information Innovation Office (I2O).
  - TCTO's mission was to develop new crosscutting capabilities from a broad range of emerging technological and social trends, particularly in areas related to computing and computing-reliant subareas of the life sciences, social sciences, manufacturing, and commerce.
  - IPTO focused on inventing the sensing, networking, computing, and software technologies vital to ensuring DoD military superiority.

=== Directors ===
Directors of DARPA have included:

No.	Image	Director	Term start	Term end	Refs.
1		Roy W. Johnson	1958	1959	
2		Austin W. Betts	1960	1961	
3		Jack Ruina	1961	1963	
4		Robert Sproull	1963	1965	
5		Charles M. Herzfeld	June 1965	March 1967	
6		Eberhardt Rechtin	1967	1970	
7		Stephen J. Lukasik	1970	1975	
8		George H. Heilmeier	1975	1977	
9		Robert R. Fossum	1977	1981	
10		Robert S. Cooper	1981	1985	
11		Robert C. Duncan	1985	1988	
12		Ray S. Colladay	1988	1989	
13		Craig I. Fields	1989	1990	
14		Victor H. Reis	1990	1992	
15		Gary L. Denman	1992	1995	
16		Verne L. "Larry" Lynn	1995	1998	
17		Fernando L. "Frank" Fernandez	1998	2001	
18		Anthony J. Tether	June 18, 2001	February 20, 2009	
acting		Robert Leheny	February 21, 2009	July 19, 2009	
19		Regina E. Dugan	July 20, 2009	March 2012	
acting		Kaigham "Ken" Gabriel	March 2012	July 29, 2012	
20		Arati Prabhakar	July 30, 2012	January 20, 2017	
acting		Steven H. Walker	January 20, 2017	November 8, 2017	
21		Steven H. Walker	November 8, 2017	January 10, 2019	
acting		Peter Highnam	January 11, 2019	September 23, 2020	
22		Victoria Coleman	September 24, 2020	January 20, 2021	
acting		Peter Highnam	January 20, 2021	March 14, 2021	
23		Stefanie Tompkins	March 15, 2021	January 20, 2025	
acting		Rob McHenry	January 20, 2025	May 19, 2025	
24		Stephen Winchell	May 19, 2025	Present	

== Projects ==
A list of DARPA's active and archived projects is available on the agency's website. Because of the agency's fast pace, programs constantly start and stop based on the needs of the U.S. government. Structured information about some of the DARPA's contracts and projects is publicly available.

=== Active projects ===
- AdvaNced airCraft Infrastructure-Less Launch And RecoverY X-Plane (ANCILLARY) (2022): The program is to develop and demonstrate a vertical takeoff and landing (VTOL) plane that can launch without the supporting infrastructure, with low-weight, high-payload, and long-endurance capabilities. In June 2023, DARPA selected nine companies to produce initial operational system and demonstration system conceptual designs for an uncrewed aerial system (UAS).
- AI Cyber Challenge (AIxCC) (2023): The AI Cyber Challenge is a two-year competition to identify and fix software vulnerabilities using AI in partnership with Anthropic, Google, Microsoft, and OpenAI which will provide their expertise and their platforms for this competition. There was a semifinal phase and a final phase. The finale was held at DEF CON in Las Vegas, Nevada in 2024 and 2025, respectively.
- Air Combat Evolution (ACE) (2019): The goal of ACE was to automate air-to-air combat, enabling reaction times at machine speeds. By using human-machine collaborative dogfighting as its challenge problem, ACE sought to increase trust in combat autonomy. Eight teams from academia and industry were selected in October 2019. In April 2024, DARPA and U.S. Air Force announced that ACE conducted the first-ever in-air dogfighting tests of AI algorithms autonomously flying an F-16 against a human-piloted F-16.
- Air Space Total Awareness for Rapid Tactical Execution (ASTARTE) (2020): This program was conducted in partnership with the Army and Air Force on sensors, artificial intelligence algorithms, and virtual testing environments in order to create an understandable common operating picture when troops are spread out across battlefields
- Biomanufacturing: Survival, Utility, and Reliability beyond Earth (B-SURE) (2021): This program aimed to address foundational scientific questions to determine how well industrial bio-manufacturing microorganisms perform in space conditions. The International Space Station (ISS) announced in April 2023 that Rhodium-DARPA Biomanufacturing 01 investigation was launched on SpaceX, and ISS crew members are carrying out this project which examines gravity's effect on production of drugs and nutrients from bacteria and yeast.
- Big Mechanism: Cancer research. (2015) This program aimed to develop technology to read research abstracts and papers to extract pieces of causal mechanisms, assemble these pieces into more complete causal models, and reason over these models to produce explanations. The domain of the program is cancer biology with an emphasis on signaling pathways. It has a successor program called World Modelers.
- Binary structure inference system: extract software properties from binary code to support repository-based reverse engineering for micro-patching that minimizes lifecycle maintenance and costs (2020).
- Blackjack (2017): a program to develop and test military satellite constellation technologies with a variety of "military-unique sensors and payloads [attached to] commercial satellite buses. ...as an 'architecture demonstration intending to show the high military utility of global LEO constellations and mesh networks of lower size, weight, and cost spacecraft nodes.' ... The idea is to demonstrate that 'good enough' payloads in LEO can perform military missions, augment existing programs, and potentially perform 'on par or better than currently deployed exquisite space systems.'" Blue Canyon Technologies, Raytheon, and SA Photonics Inc. were working on phases 2 and 3 as of fiscal year 2020. On June 12, 2023, DARPA launched four satellites for a technology demonstration in low Earth orbit on the SpaceX Transporter-8 rideshare.
- BlockADE: Rapidly constructed barrier. (2014)
- Causal Exploration of Complex Operational Environments ("Causal Exploration") – computerized aid to military planning. (2018)
- Collaborative Operations in Denied Environment (CODE): Modular software architecture for UAVs to pass information to each other in contested environments to identify and engage targets with limited operator direction. (2015)
- Control of Revolutionary Aircraft with Novel Effectors (CRANE) (2019): This program sought to demonstrate an experimental aircraft design based on active flow control (AFC), which is defined as on-demand addition of energy into a boundary layer in order to maintain, recover, or improve aerodynamic performance. The aim was for CRANE to generally improve aircraft performance and reliability while reducing cost. In May 2023, DARPA designated the experimental uncrewed aircraft the X-65 which will use banks of compressed air nozzles to execute maneuvers without traditional, exterior-moving flight controls.
- Computational Weapon Optic (CWO) (2015): Computer rifle scope that combines various features into one optic.
- DARPA Triage Challenge (DTC) (2023): The DTC used a series of challenge events to spur development of novel physiological features for medical triage. The three-year competition focuses on improving emergency medical response in military and civilian mass casualty incidents.
- DARPA XG (2005): Technology for Dynamic Spectrum Access for assured military communications.
- Demonstration Rocket for Agile Cislunar Operations (DRACO) (2021): The program is to demonstrate a nuclear thermal rocket (NTR) in orbit by 2027 in collaboration with NASA (nuclear thermal engine) and U.S. Space Force (launch).
- Detection system consisting of Clustered Regularly Interspaced Short Palindromic Repeats (CRISPR)-based assays paired with reconfigurable point-of-need and massively multi-plexed devices for diagnostics and surveillance
- Electronics Resurgence Initiative (ERI) (2019): Started in 2019, the initiative aims at both national security capabilities and commercial economic competitiveness and sustainability. These programs emphasize forward-looking partnerships with U.S. industry, the defense industrial base, and university researchers. In 2023, DARPA expanded ERI's focus with the announcement of ERI 2.0 seeking to reinvent domestic microelectronics manufacturing.
- Experimental Spaceplane 1 (formerly XS-1): In 2017, Boeing was selected for Phases 2 and 3 for the fabrication and flight of a reusable unmanned space transport after it completed the initial design in Phase 1 as one of the three teams. In January 2020, Boeing ended its role in the program.
- Fast Lightweight Autonomy: Software algorithms that enable small UAVs to fly fast in cluttered environments without GPS or external communications. (2014)
- Fast Network Interface Cards (FastNICs): develop and integrate new, clean-slate network subsystems in order to speed up applications, such as the distributed training of machine learning classifiers by 100x. Perspecta Labs and Raytheon BBN were working on FastNICs as of fiscal year 2020.
- Force Application and Launch from Continental United States (FALCON): a research effort to develop a small satellite launch vehicle. (2008) This vehicle is under development by AirLaunch LLC.
- Gamma Ray Inspection Technology (GRIT) program: research and develop high-intensity, tunable, and narrow-bandwidth gamma ray production in compact, transportable form. This technology can be utilized for discovering smuggled nuclear material in cargo via new inspection techniques, and enabling new medical diagnostics and therapies. RadiaBeam Technologies LLC was working on a phase 1 of the program, Laser-Compton approach, in fiscal year 2020.
- Glide Breaker program: technology for an advanced interceptor capable of engaging maneuvering hypersonic vehicles or missiles in the upper atmosphere. Northrop Grumman and Aerojet Rocketdyne were working on this program as of fiscal year 2020.
- Gremlins (2015): Air-launched and recoverable UAVs with distributed capabilities to provide low-cost flexibility over expensive multirole platforms. In October 2021, two X-61 Gremlin air vehicles were tested at the Army's Dugway Proving Ground, Utah.
- Ground X-Vehicle Technology (GXV-T) (2015): This program aims to improve mobility, survivability, safety, and effectiveness of future combat vehicles without piling on armor.
- High Operational Temperature Sensors (HOTS)(2023): The program is to develop sensor microelectronics consisting of transducers, signal conditioning microelectronics, and integration that operate with high bandwidth (>1 MHz) and dynamic range (>90 dB) at extreme temperatures (i.e., at least 800 °C).
- HIVE (Hierarchical Identify Verify Exploit) CPU architecture. (2017)
- Hypersonic Air-breathing Weapon Concept (HAWC). This program is a joint DARPA/U.S. Air Force effort that seeks to develop and demonstrate critical technologies to enable an effective and affordable air-launched hypersonic cruise missile.
- Insect Allies (2017–2021)
- Intelligent Integration of Information (I3) in SISTO, 1994–2000 – supported database research and with ARPA CISTO and NASA funded the NSF Digital Library program, that led. a.o. to Google.
- Joint All-Domain Warfighting Software (JAWS): software suite featuring automation and predictive analytics for battle management and command & control with tactical coordination for capture ("target custody") and kill missions. Systems & Technology Research of Woburn, Massachusetts, is working on this project, with an expected completion date of March 2022. Raytheon is also working on this project, with an expected completion date of April 2022.
- Lasers for Universal Microscale Optical Systems (LUMOS): integrate heterogeneous materials to bring high performance lasers and amplifiers to manufacturable photonics platforms. As of fiscal year 2020, the Research Foundation for the State University of New York (SUNY) was working to enable "on-chip optical gain" to integrated photonics platforms, and enable complete photonics functionality "on a single substrate for disruptive optical microsystems."
- LongShot (2021): The program is to demonstrate an unmanned air-launched vehicle (UAV) capable of employing air-to-air weapons. Phase 1 design work started in early 2021. In June 2023, DARPA awarded a Phase 3 contract to General Atomics for the manufacturing and a flight demonstration in 2025 of an air-launched, flying and potentially recoverable missile carrier.
- Manta Ray: A 2020 DARPA program to develop a series of autonomous, large-size, unmanned underwater vehicles (UUVs) capable of long-duration missions and having large payload capacities. In December 2021, DARPA awarded Phase 2 contracts to Northrop Grumman Systems Corporation and Martin Defense Group to work on subsystem testing followed by fabrication and in-water demonstrations of full-scale integrated vehicles.

By May 2024, Manta Ray was not only the descriptor for the DARPA R&D program, but was also the name of a specific prototype UUV built by Northrop Grumman, with initial tests conducted in the Pacific Ocean during 1Q2024. Manta Ray has been designed to be broken down and fit into 5 standard shipping containers, shipped to where it will be deployed, and be reassembled in the theatre of operations where it will be used. DARPA is working with the US Navy to further test and then transition the technology.

- Media Forensics (MediFor): A project aimed at automatically spotting digital manipulation in images and videos, including Deepfakes. (2018). MediFor largely ended in 2020 and DARPA launched a follow-on program in 2021 called the semantic forensics, or SemaFor.
- Millimeter-wave GaN Maturation (MGM) program: develop new GaN transistor technology to attain high-speed and large voltage swing at the same time. HRL Laboratories LLC, a joint venture between Boeing and General Motors, is working on phase 2 as of fiscal year 2020.
- Modular Optical Aperture Building Blocks (MOABB) program (2015): design free-space optical components (e.g., telescope, bulk lasers with mechanical beam-steering, detectors, electronics) in a single device. Create a wafer-scale system that is one hundred times smaller and lighter than existing systems and can steer the optical beam far faster than mechanical components. Research and design electronic-photonic unit cells that can be tiled together to form large-scale planar apertures (up to 10 centimeters in diameter) that can run at 100 watts of optical power. The overall goals of such technology are (1) rapid 3D scanning using devices smaller than a cell-phone camera; (2) high-speed laser communications without mechanical steering; (3) and foliage-penetrating perimeter sensing, remote wind sensing, and long-range 3-D mapping. As of fiscal year 2020, Analog Photonics LLC of Boston, Massachusetts, was working on phase 3 of the program and is expected to finish by May 2022.
- Multi- Azimuth Defense Fast Intercept Round Engagement System (MAD-FIRES) program: develop technologies that combine advantages of a missile (guidance, precision, accuracy) with advantages of a bullet (speed, rapid-fire, large ammunition capacity) to be used on a medium-caliber guided projectile in defending ships. Raytheon is currently working on MAD-FIRES phase 3 (enhance seeker performance, and develop a functional demonstration illuminator and engagement manager to engage and defeat a representative surrogate target) and is expected to be finished by November 2022.
- Near Zero Power RF and Sensor Operations (N-ZERO): Reducing or eliminating the standby power unattended ground sensors consume. (2015)
- Neural implants for soldiers. (2014)
- No Manning Required Ship (NOMARS): USX-1 Defiant, a medium uncrewed surface vessel (USV) was first seen in public in March 2025
- Novel, nonsurgical, bi-directional brain-computer interface with high spacio-temporal resolution and low latency for potential human use.
- Open, Programmable, Secure 5G (OPS-5G) (2020): The program is to address security risks of 5G networks by pursuing research leading to the development of a portable standards-compliant network stack for 5G mobile that is open source and secure by design. OPS-5G seeks to create open source software and systems that enable secure 5G and subsequent mobile networks such as 6G.
- Operational Fires (OpFires): developing a new mobile ground-launched booster that helps hypersonic boost glide weapons penetrate enemy air defenses. As of 17 July 2020, Lockheed Martin was working on phase 3 of the program (develop propulsion components for the missile's Stage 2 section) to be completed by January 2022. The system was successfully tested in July 2022.
- Persistent Close Air Support (PCAS): DARPA created the program in 2010 to seek to fundamentally increase Close Air Support effectiveness by enabling dismounted ground agents—Joint Terminal Attack Controllers—and combat aircrews to share real-time situational awareness and weapons systems data.
- Robotic Servicing of Geosynchronous Satellites program (RSGS): a telerobotic and autonomous robotic satellite-servicing project, conceived in 2017. In 2020, DARPA selected Northrop Grumman's SpaceLogistics as its RSGS partner. The U.S. Naval Research Laboratory designed and developed the RSGS robotic arm with DARPA funding. The RSGS system is anticipated to start servicing satellites in space in 2025.
- Robotic Autonomy in Complex Environments with Resiliency (RACER) (2020): This is a four-year program and aims to make sure algorithms aren't the limiting part of the system and that autonomous combat vehicles can meet or exceed soldier driving abilities. RACER conducted its third experiment to assess the performance of off-road unmanned vehicles March 12–27, 2023.
- SafeGenes: a synthetic biology project to program "undo" sequences into gene editing programs (2016)
- Sea Train (2019): The program goal is to develop and demonstrate ways to overcome range limitations in medium unmanned surface vessels by exploiting wave-making resistance reductions. Applied Physical Sciences Corp. of Groton, Connecticut, is undertaking Phase 1 of the Sea Train program, with an expected completion date of March 2022. Sea Train, NOMARS and Manta Ray are the three programs that could significantly impact naval operations by extending the range and payloads for unmanned vessels on and below the surface.
- Secure Advanced Framework for Simulation & Modeling (SAFE-SiM) program: build a rapid modeling and simulation environment to enable quick analysis in support of senior-level decision-making. As of fiscal year 2020, Radiance Technologies and L3Harris were working on portions of the program, with expected completion in August and September 2021, respectively.
- Securing Information for Encrypted Verification and Evaluation (SIEVE) program: use zero knowledge proofs to enable the verification of capabilities for the US military "without revealing the sensitive details associated with those capabilities." Galois Inc. of Portland, Oregon, and Stealth Software Technologies of Los Angeles, California, are currently working on the SIEVE program, with a projected completion date of May 2024.
- Semantic Forensics (SemaFor) program: develop technologies to automatically detect, attribute, and characterize falsified media (e.g., text, audio, image, video) to defend against automated disinformation. SRI International of Menlo Park, California, and Kitware Inc. of Clifton Park, New York, are working on the SemaFor program, with an expected completion date of July 2024.
- Sensor plants: DARPA "is working on a plan to use plants to gather intelligence information" through DARPA's Advanced Plant Technologies (APT) program, which aims to control the physiology of plants in order to detect chemical, biological, radiological and nuclear threats. (2017)
- Synthetic Hemo-technologIEs to Locate and Disinfect (SHIELD) (2023): The program aims to develop prophylaxes and prevent bloodstream infections (BSI) caused by bacterial/fungal agents, a threat to military and civilian populations.
- SIGMA: A network of radiological detection devices the size of smart phones that can detect small amounts of radioactive materials. The devices are paired with larger detector devices along major roads and bridges. (2016)
- SIGMA+ program (2018): by building on concepts theorized in the SIGMA program, develop new sensors and analytics to detect small traces of explosives and chemical and biological weaponry throughout any given large metropolitan area. In October 2021, SIGMA+ program, in collaboration with the Indianapolis Metropolitan Police Department (IMPD), concluded a three-month-long pilot study with new sensors to support early detection and interdictions of weapons of mass destruction (WMD) threats.
- SoSITE: System of Systems Integration Technology and Experimentation: Combinations of aircraft, weapons, sensors, and mission systems that distribute air warfare capabilities across a large number of interoperable manned and unmanned platforms. (2015)
- SSITH: System Security Integrated Through Hardware and Firmware - secure hardware platform (2017); basis for open-source, hack-proof voting system project and 2019 system prototype contract
- SXCT: Squad X Core Technologies: Digitized, integrated technologies that improve infantry squads' awareness, precision, and influence. (2015)
- Tactical Boost Glide (TBG): Air-launched hypersonic boost glide missile. (2016)
- Tactically Exploited Reconnaissance Node (Tern)(2014): The program seeks to develop ship based UAS systems and technologies to enable a future air vehicle that could provide persistent ISR and strike capabilities beyond the limited range and endurance provided by existing helicopter platforms.
- ULTRA-Vis (Urban Leader Tactical Response, Awareness and Visualization): Heads-up display for individual soldiers. (2014)
- underwater network, heterogeneous: develop concepts and reconfigurable architecture, leveraging advancement in undersea communications and autonomous ocean systems, to demonstrate utility at sea. Raytheon BBN is currently working on this program, with work expected through 4 May 2021, though if the government exercises all options on the contract then work will continue through 4 February 2024.
- Upward Falling Payloads: Payloads stored on the ocean floor that can be activated and retrieved when needed. (2014)
- Urban Reconnaissance through Supervised Autonomy (URSA) program: develop technology for use in cities to enable autonomous systems that U.S. infantry and ground forces operate to detect and identify enemies before U.S. troops come across them. Program will factor in algorithms, multiple sensors, and scientific knowledge about human behavior to determine subtle differences between hostiles and innocent civilians. Soar Technology Inc. of Ann Arbor, Michigan, is currently working on pertinent vehicle autonomy technology, with work expected completed by March 2022.
- Warrior Web: Soft exosuit to alleviate musculoskeletal stress on soldiers when carrying heavy loads. (2014)
- Waste Upcycling for Defense (WUD) (2023): to turn scrap wood, cardboard, paper, and other cellulose-derived matter into sustainable materials such as building materials for re-use.
- 2023 MINC provides integrated critical data flow network in contested environment

=== Undated programs ===
- Atmospheric Water Extraction (AWE) program[82]
- Captive Air Amphibious Transporter (CAAT)[97]
- broadband, electro-magnetic spectrum receiver system: prototype and demonstration[95]
- Clean-Slate Design of Resilient, Adaptive, Secure Hosts (CRASH), a DARPA Transformation Convergence Technology Office (TCTO) initiative[100]
- High Productivity Computing Systems[130]
- Hypersonic Air-breathing Weapon Concept (HAWC)[133]
- Hypersonic Boost Glide Systems Research[134]
- Integrated Sensor is Structure (ISIS)[138] - This was a joint DARPA and U.S. Air Force program to develop a sensor of unprecedented proportions to be fully integrated into a stratospheric airship.
- MEMS Exchange[154][155] - Microelectromechanical systems (MEMS) Implementation Environment (MX)
- PREventing EMerging Pathogenic Threats (PREEMPT)
- QuASAR: Quantum Assisted Sensing and Readout
- QuBE: Quantum Effects in Biological Environments
- QUEST: Quantum Entanglement Science and Technology
- Quiness: Macroscopic Quantum Communications
- QUIST: Quantum Information Science and Technology
- RADICS: Rapid Attack Detection, Isolation and Characterization Systems
- Rational Integrated Design of Energetics (RIDE): developing tools that speed up and facilitate energetics research.
- Remote-controlled insects
- SyNAPSE[209] - Systems of Neuromorphic Adaptive Plastic Scalable Electronics
- TransApps (Transformative Applications) - rapid development and fielding of secure mobile apps in the battlefield

=== Past or transitioned projects ===
- ACTIVE SOCIAL ENGINEERING DEFENSE - a research to automatically target social engineering attacks
- 4MM (4-minute mile): Wearable jetpack to enable soldiers to run at increased speed.
- Air Dominance Initiative: a 2015 program to develop technologies to be used in sixth-generation jet fighters. The Air Dominance Initiative study led to the U.S. Air Force's sixth-generation air superiority initiative, the Next Generation Air Dominance.
- Anti-submarine warfare (ASW) Continuous Trail Unmanned Vessel (ACTUV) (2010): A project to build an unmanned anti-submarine warfare vessel.
- AGM-158C LRASM: Anti-ship cruise missile.
- Adaptive Vehicle Make: Revolutionary approaches to the design, verification, and manufacturing of complex defense systems and vehicles.
- ARPA Midcourse Optical Station (AMOS), a research facility that now forms part of the Haleakala Observatory.
- ArcLight: Ship-based weapon system capable of striking targets nearly anywhere on the globe, based on the Standard Missile 3.
- ARPANET, earliest predecessor of the Internet.
- Assault Breaker: technology integration to defeat armored attacks
- ASTOVL, precursor of the Joint Strike Fighter program
- The Aspen Movie Map allowed one to virtually tour the streets of Aspen, Colorado. Developed in 1978, it is the earliest predecessor to products like Google Street View.
- Atlas: A humanoid robot.
- Battlefield Illusion
- BigDog/Legged Squad Support System (2012): legged robots.
- Boeing Pelican
- Boeing X-37 (2004): The X-37 program was transferred from NASA to DARPA in September 2004.
- The Boeing X-45 unmanned combat aerial vehicle refers to a mid-2000s concept demonstrator for autonomous military aircraft.
- Boomerang (mobile shooter detection system): an acoustic gunfire locator developed by BBN Technologies for detecting snipers on military combat vehicles.
- CALO or "Cognitive Assistant that Learns and Organizes": software
- Combat Zones That See (CTS): "track everything that moves" in a city by linking up a massive network of surveillance cameras
- Cognitive Technology Threat Warning System (CT2WS) (2011)
- Consortium for Execution of Rendezvous and Servicing Operations (CONFERS) (2017).
- CPOF: the command post of the future—networked information system for Command control.
- DAML
- ALASA: (Airborne Launch Assist Space Access): A rocket capable of launching a 100-pound satellite into low Earth orbit for less than $1 million.
- FALCON
- DARPA Grand Challenge: driverless car competitions
- DARPA GXV-T: Ground X Vehicle
- Hydra: Undersea network of mobile unmanned sensors. (2013)
- DARPA Network Challenge (before 2010)
- DARPA Shredder Challenge 2011 – Reconstruction of shredded documents
- DARPA Silent Talk: A planned program attempting to identify EEG patterns for words and transmit these for covert communications.
- DARPA Spectrum Challenge (2014)
- DEFENDER
- Defense Simulation Internet, a wide-area network supporting Distributed Interactive Simulation
- Discoverer II radar satellite constellation
- EATR
- EXACTO: Sniper rifle firing guided smart bullets.
- GALE: Global Autonomous Language Exploitation
- High Frequency Active Auroral Research Program (HAARP): An ionospheric research program jointly funded by DARPA, the U.S. Air Force's AFRL and the U.S. Navy's NRL. The most prominent area during this research was the high-power radio frequency transmitter facility, which tested the use of the Ionospheric Research Instrument (IRI).
- High Energy Liquid Laser Area Defense System (HELLADS) The goal of the HELLADS program was to develop a 150 kilowatt (kW) laser weapon system. In 2015, DARPA's contractor, General Atomics, successfully demonstrated a prototype. In 2020, General Atomics and Boeing announced to develop a 100 kW liquid laser system, with plans to scale it up to 250 kW.
- High Performance Knowledge Bases
- HISSS
- Human Universal Load Carrier: battery-powered human exoskeleton.
- Hypersonic Research Program
- Luke Arm, a DEKA creation produced under the Revolutionizing Prosthetics program.
- MAHEM: Molten penetrating munition.
- MEMEX (2014–2017): an online search tool to fight human trafficking crimes on the dark web. In 2016, DARPA Memex program received the 2016 Presidential Award for Extraordinary Efforts to Combat Trafficking in Persons for the development of the anti-trafficking technology tool. The program was named and inspired by the Vannevar Bush's hypothetical device described in his 1945 article.
- MeshWorm: an earthworm-like robot.
- Mind's Eye: A visual intelligence system capable of detecting and analyzing activity from video feeds.
- MOSIS
- MQ-1 Predator
- Multics
- Next Generation Tactical Wearable Night Vision: Smaller and lighter sunglass-sized night vision devices that can switch between different viewing bands.
- NLS/Augment: the origin of the canonical contemporary computer user interface
- Northrop Grumman Switchblade: an unmanned oblique-wing flying aircraft for high speed, long range and long endurance flight
- One Shot: Sniper scope that automatically measures crosswind and range to ensure accuracy in field conditions.
- Onion routing, a technique developed in the mid-1990s and later employed by Tor to anonymize communications over a computer network.
- OpenROAD Project: open-source EDA software passed onto nonprofit OpenRoad Initiative
- Passive radar
- Phoenix: A 2012–early-2015 satellite project with the aim to recycle retired satellite parts into new on-orbit assets. The project was initiated in July 2012 with plans for system launches no earlier than 2016. At the time, Satlet tests in low Earth orbit were projected to occur as early as 2015.
- Policy Analysis Market, evaluating the trading of information futures contracts based on possible political developments in several Middle Eastern countries. An application of prediction markets.
- POSSE
- Project AGILE, a Vietnam War-era investigation into methods of remote, asymmetric warfare for use in conflicts with Communist insurgents.
- Project MAC
- Proto 2: a thought-controlled prosthetic arm
- QB: Quantum Benchmarking - a program designed to estimate the long-term utility of quantum computers and whether demonstrable quantum advantage exists. Program participants included University of Southern California, HRL Laboratories, L3Harris, Rigetti Computing and Zapata Computing, now Zapata Quantum.
- Rapid Knowledge Formation
- Sea Shadow
- SIMNET: Wide area network with vehicle simulators and displays for real-time distributed combat simulation: tanks, helicopters and airplanes in a virtual battlefield.
- System F6—Future, Fast, Flexible, Fractionated Free-flying Spacecraft United by Information Exchange—technology demonstrator: a 2006–2012
- I3 (Intelligent Integration of Information), supported the Digital Library research effort through NSF
- Strategic Computing Program
- Synthetic Aperture Ladar for Tactical Applications (SALTI)
- XOS: powered military exoskeleton $226 million technology development program. Cancelled in 2013 before the notionally planned 2015 launch date.
- SURAN (1983–87)
- Project Vela (1963)
- UAVForge (2011)
- Vertical Take-Off and Landing Experimental Aircraft (VTOL X-Plane) (2013)
- Viet Cong Motivation and Morale Project (1964–1968)
- Vulture: Long endurance, high-altitude unmanned aerial vehicle.
- VLSI Project (1978) – Its offspring include BSD Unix, the RISC processor concept, many CAD tools still in use today.
- Walrus HULA: high-capacity, long range cargo airship.
- Wireless Network after Next (WNaN), advanced tactical mobile ad hoc network
- WolfPack (2010)
- XDATA: Processing and analyzing vast amounts of information. (2012)
- Rockwell-MBB X-31
- Grumman X-29

== Notable fiction ==
DARPA is well known as a high-tech government agency, and as such has many appearances in popular fiction. Some realistic references to DARPA in fiction are as "ARPA" in Tom Swift and the Visitor from Planet X (DARPA consults on a technical threat), in episodes of television program The West Wing (the ARPA-DARPA distinction), the television program Numb3rs, and the Netflix film Spectral.

== See also ==
- Air Force Nuclear Weapons Center (NWC)
- Air Force Research Laboratory (AFRL)
- Advanced Research Projects Agency–Energy (ARPA-E)
- Advanced Research Projects Agency for Health (ARPA-H)
- Advanced Research Projects Agency–Infrastructure (ARPA-I)
- Engineer Research and Development Center (ERDC)
- Homeland Security Advanced Research Projects Agency (HSARPA)
- Intelligence Advanced Research Projects Activity (IARPA)
- Joint European Disruptive Initiative (JEDI)
- Lawrence Berkeley National Laboratory (LBNL or LBL)
- Lawrence Livermore National Laboratory (LLNL)
- Los Alamos National Laboratory (LANL)
- Marine Corps Combat Development Command (MCCDC)
- Naval Air Weapons Station China Lake (NAWS)
- Naval Research Laboratory (NRL)
- Office of Naval Research (ONR)
- Pacific Northwest National Laboratory (PNNL)
- Sandia National Laboratories (SNL)
- United States Army Armament Research, Development and Engineering Center (ARDEC)
- United States Army Research, Development and Engineering Command (RDECOM)
- United States Army Research Laboratory (ARL)
- United States Marine Corps Warfighting Laboratory (MCWL)
