= Iyad Rahwan =

Syrian-Australian computational social scientist

- إياد رهوان
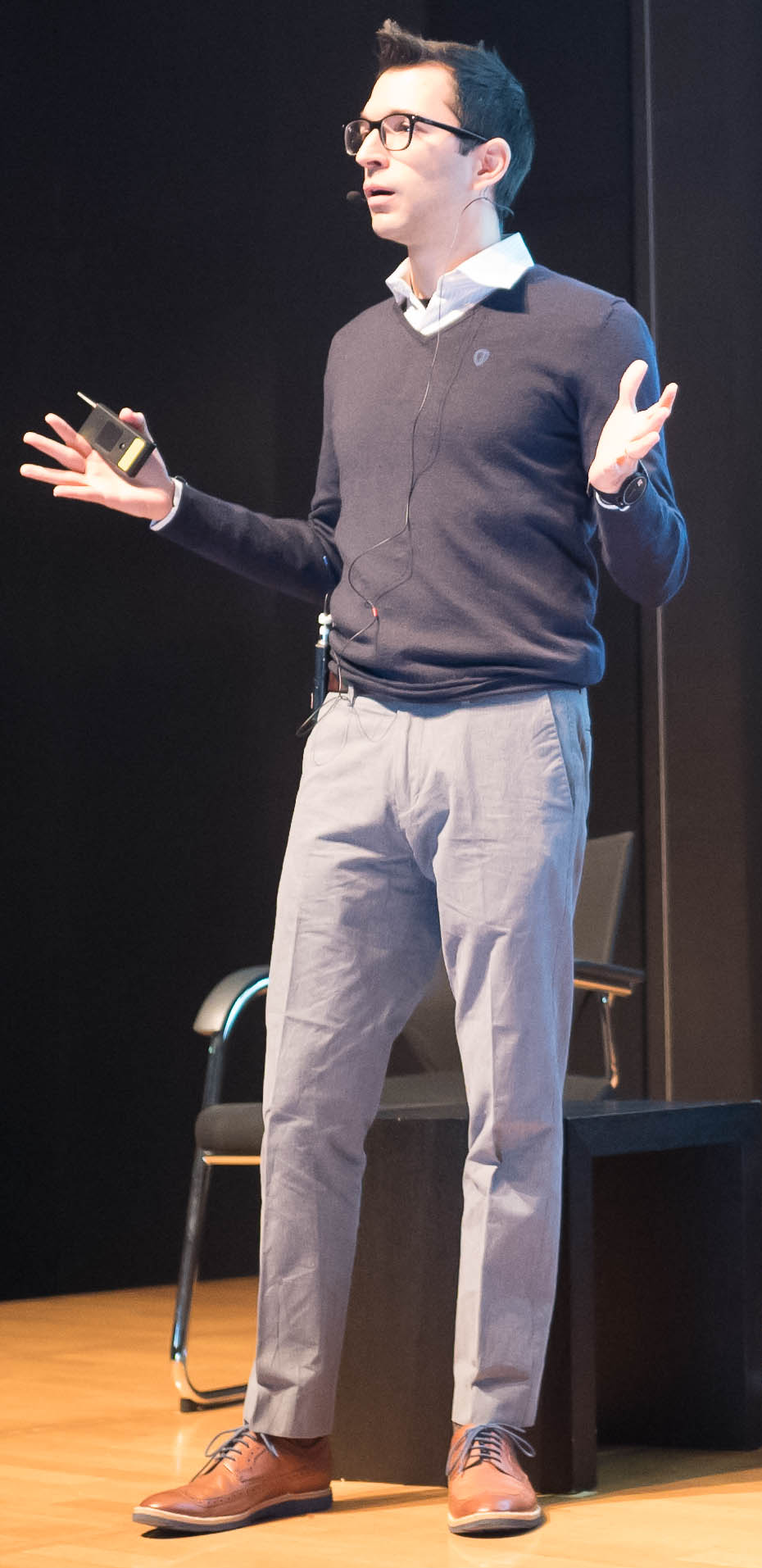
- Born: 1978 (age 47–48); Aleppo, Syria
- Education: University of Melbourne
- Scientific career
- Fields: Computational social science, Artificial intelligence, Ethics, Cognitive science, Game theory, Crowdsourcing
- Workplaces: Max Planck Institute for Human Development
- Doctoral advisor: Liz Sonenberg
- Other academic advisors: Alex Pentland
- Website: https://rahwan.me/

Iyad Rahwan (Arabic: إياد رهوان) is a Syrian-Australian scientist. He is the director of the Center for Humans and Machines at the Max Planck Institute for Human Development in Berlin. Between 2015 and 2020, he was an associate professor of Media Arts & Sciences at the MIT Media Lab. Rahwan's work lies at the intersection of the computer and social sciences, where he has investigated topics in computational social science, collective intelligence, large-scale cooperation, and the social aspects of artificial intelligence.

== Biography ==
Rahwan was born in Aleppo, Syria. He earned an Information Systems PhD in 2005 from the University of Melbourne. As an assistant and then associate professor in Computing and Information Science at MIT-partnered Masdar Institute of Science and Technology, Rahwan investigated scalable social mobilization's possibilities, limits, and challenges in various contexts by analyzing data from the 2009 DARPA Network Challenge, the DARPA Shredder Challenge 2011, and the 2012 US State Department Tag Challenge. In 2015, Rahwan started the Scalable Cooperation Group at the MIT Media Lab, where he is the AT&T Career Development Professor and an associate professor of Media Arts & Sciences, as well as an affiliate faculty at the MIT Institute of Data, Systems and Society. Since 2019 Rahwan is director of the Max Planck Institute for Human Development in Berlin, where he founded and directs the Center for Humans and Machines.

== Machine Behavior ==
Together with Manuel Cebrian and Nick Obradovich, Rahwan spearheaded an effort to establish the field of Machine Behavior. This field is concerned with the scientific study of Artificial Intelligence systems, not as engineering artifacts, but as a class of actors with particular behavioral patterns and ecology. This field overlaps with, but is distinct from, computer science and robotics. It treats machine behaviour empirically, in the same way that ethology and behavioral ecology study animal behavior without a full understanding of the bio-chemical mechanisms. The contours and fundamental research questions in the field of Machine Behavior were outlined by Rahwan, Obradovich and Cebrian, together with twenty co-authors from across the computational and behavioral sciences, in an article in the journal Nature.

== Morality and Machines ==
=== Ethics of Autonomous Vehicles ===
Rahwan is one of the first to consider the problem of self autonomous vehicles as an ethical dilemma. His 2016 paper, The Social Dilemma of Autonomous Vehicles, showed that people approved of utilitarian autonomous vehicles, and wanted others to purchase these vehicles, but they themselves would prefer to ride in an autonomous vehicle that protected its passenger at all costs, and would not use self-driving vehicles if utilitarianism was imposed on them by law. Thus the paper concludes the regulation of utilitarian algorithms could paradoxically increase casualties by driving by inadvertently postponing the adoption of a safer technology. The paper spurred much coverage about the role of ethics in the creation of artificially intelligent driving systems.

=== Moral Machine ===
Moral Machine is an online platform that generates ethical dilemma scenarios faced by hypothetical autonomous machines, allowing visitors to assess the scenarios and vote on the most morally acceptable between two unavoidable harm outcomes. The presented scenarios are often variations of the trolley problem. As of December 2017, the platform has collected 40 million decisions from millions of visitors from 233 countries and territories. Analysis of the data showed broad differences in relative preferences among different countries, and correlations between these preferences and various national metrics.

=== Cooperating with Machines ===
Together with Jacob Crandall and others, Rahwan studied human-machine cooperation by exploring how state-of-the-art reinforcement learning algorithms perform when playing repeated games against humans. The authors showed that providing a medium of communication can result in an algorithm learning to cooperate with its human partner faster and more effectively than a human in these strategic games.

== AI and the Future of Work ==
Together with his student Morgan Frank and collaborators, Rahwan explored the relationship between city size and the potential impact of artificial intelligence and automation on employment. They used a variety of estimates of the risk of automation of different jobs. Their main finding is that smaller cities may experience greater impact due to automation. Related work explores the polarization of the US labor market, due to the underlying polarized structure of workplace skills.

== Other projects ==
=== The Tag Challenge ===
Rahwan led the winning team in the 2012 US State Department Tag Challenge, using crowdsourcing and a referral-incentivizing reward mechanism (similar to the one used in the 2009 DARPA Network Challenge) to locate individuals in European and American cities within 12 hours each, given only their photographic portraits.

=== The Nightmare Machine ===
The Nightmare Machine, developed under Rahwan's guidance, creates computer generated imagery powered by deep learning algorithms to learn from human feedback and generate a visual approximation of what humans might find "scary".
