= Mass mobilization =

Mobilization of the civilian population as part of contentious policies

Mass mobilization (also known as social mobilization or popular mobilization) refers to mobilization of civilian population as part of contentious politics. Mass mobilization is defined as a process that engages and motivates a wide range of partners and allies at national and local levels to raise awareness of and demand for a particular development objective through face-to-face dialogue. Members of institutions, community networks, civic and religious groups and others work in a coordinated way to reach specific groups of people for dialogue with planned messages. In other words, social mobilization seeks to facilitate change through a range of players engaged in interrelated and complementary efforts.

The process usually takes the form of large public gatherings such as mass meetings, marches, parades, processions and demonstrations. Those gatherings usually are part of a protest action. Mass mobilization is often used by grassroots-based social movements, including revolutionary movements, but can also become a tool of elites and the state itself.

In a study of over 200 violent revolutions and over 100 nonviolent campaigns, Erica Chenoweth has shown that civil disobedience is, by far, the most powerful way of affecting public policy. The study identified that an active participation of around 3.5% of a population will ensure serious political change. Mass mobilization was an important element in waves of democratization from the early 1980s to the 2010s.

== Mass mobilization for social movements ==
Social movements are groups that protest against social or political issues. Different social movements try to make the public and politicians aware of different social problems. For social movements it is important to solve collective action problems. When social movements protest for something in the interest of the whole society, it is easier for the individual to not protest. The individual will benefit the outcome, but will not risk anything by participating in the protest. This is also known as the free-rider problem. Social movements must convince people to join the movement to solve this problem.

=== Examples ===
Opposition to United States involvement in the Vietnam War. During the Vietnam war, supporters and opponents of the war mobilized for protests. Social movements against the war were groups of students or veterans. These groups did not believe the war was justified and that the United States had to pull out the troops stationed there. To counter these protests, president Richard Nixon addressed the 'silent majority', the people who did support the war, to organize counter protests supporting the war.

Yellow vests movement is a social movement originated in Paris. The protests started when president Emmanuel Macron announced a fuel tax increase. Protesters saw this as a tax on the working class, the people in the countryside who have to drive to work. At first, the movement was successful. A lot of people joined and a majority of the population supported it. After the first weeks, the movement fell apart and some factions became violent. The number of protesters and support of the population decreased.

== Government mass mobilization ==
Governments can promote mass mobilization to support the causes they promote. Many governments attempt to mobilize the population to participate in elections and other voting events. In particular, it is important for political parties in any country to be able to mobilize voters in order to gain support for their party, which affects voter turnout in general.

=== Examples ===
Nazi Germany applied mass mobilization techniques to win support for their policies. The Nazi Party mobilized the population with mass meetings, parades, and other gatherings. These events appealed to the people's emotions.

North Korea frequently employs mass mobilization to convince its people to publicly express loyalty around important events and holidays. Mobilization is also used to acquire a workforce for tasks such as construction, farm work, keeping public places clean, and urgent disaster relief. Mass mobilization is also used to acquire hard currency. Participating in mobilization campaigns is mandatory and failure to appear may result in penalties. However, for some, it is possible to bribe themselves out of the duty.

== Mass mobilization in social media ==
The effect of social media on mass mobilization can both be negative and positive. Cyberoptimists believe social media make protests easier to organize. Political ideas spread quickly on social media and everyone can participate in online political actions. Ruijgruk identified four mechanisms the internet helps mobilizing people in authoritarian regimes.

- It reduces the risks of the opposition. To be politically active online is less risky than to be active on the streets. The opposition can meet online and organize protests without having to meet in a physical place.
- It can change the attitude of the citizens. When news independent from the government can spread online, people will get a more honest image of their government. On the long term, even people who are satisfied with their life can become politically active and be mobilized to protest against the regime.
- It reduces uncertainty for individuals. When people see a lot of people will be attending the protests, people are more inclined to join. The risk of getting punished is lower when there are a lot of people at the protests.
- Dramatic videos and pictures will reach more people if they are shared online. People who get to see those images are more inclined to join the protests.

Cyberpessimists point to the effect these online actions have. By liking or sharing a political post, someone might think they are politically active, but they are not really doing anything effective. This useless activism, or slacktivism does not contribute to the overall goal of the social movement. It also increases the collective action problem. Someone might think they already contributed to the cause, so they are less likely to go to a physical protest.

Social media is also used by states in order to check society. Authoritarian states use social media to track and punish activists and political opponents. There are several ways to do this. State led internet providers can use a monopoly position to provide information about internet behaviour to secret services. These providers can also shut down the internet if the government faces mass mobilization, what happened in the Arab Spring.

To organise out of sight of authorities, people use encrypted online messaging services such as WhatsApp or Telegram. Virtual private networks may also be used.

=== Examples ===
DARPA Network Challenge

Tag Challenge

==== Arab Spring ====
The Arab Spring was a revolutionary wave of demonstrations and protests occurring in the Arab world that began on 18 December 2010. Rulers were forced from power in Tunisia, Egypt, Libya, and Yemen; civil uprisings erupted in Bahrain and Syria; major protests broke out in Algeria, Iraq, Jordan, Kuwait, Morocco, and Oman; with minor protests in Lebanon, Mauritania, Saudi Arabia, Sudan, and Western Sahara. Clashes at the borders of Israel in May 2011, as well as protests by the Arab minority in Iranian Khuzestan, were also inspired by the regional Arab Spring.

The protests shared techniques of mostly civil resistance in sustained campaigns involving strikes, demonstrations, marches, rallies, as well as the use of social media to organise, communicate, and raise awareness in the face of state attempts at repression and Internet censorship.

== Nonviolence vs violent tactics ==
According to Donatella della Porta and Sidney Tarrow, the mechanism that produces violence in the declining phase of the collective action cycle is a result of the competition that arises among different sectors of the social movement. Together they formed a theory stating that as mass mobilisation winds down, political violence rises in magnitude and intensity.

=== Examples ===
==== Italy ====
In his study of the wave of mass protests that took place in Italy between 1965 and 1975, Sidney Tarrow stated that "[i]n the final stages of the cycle, there was an increase in the deliberate use of violence against others. But this increase was a function of the decline of mass protest, not of its extension. Indeed, deliberate targeted violence did not become common until 1972-3, when all the other forms of collective action had declined." All of which leads him to forcefully conclude that "organized violence was the product of demobilization." Donatella della Porta, in her comparative analysis of political violence and cycles of protest in Italy and Germany between 1960 and 1990, maintains that "when mass mobilization declined, the movements went back to more institutional forms of collective action, whereas small groups resorted to more organized forms of violence."

==== USSR ====
Mark R. Beissinger, in his study on cycles of protest and nationalist violence in the Soviet Union between 1987 and 1992, also detects this pattern, but in this case violence takes the form of ethnic communal conflict rather than terrorism. As he says, "the rise of violence in the USSR in significant part was associated with the decline of nonviolent mobilization contesting interrepublican borders."

==== Russia ====
During the 1870s, the "populists" or "nihilists", the proponents of a Russian variant of anarchism, organized the so-called "pilgrimages to the people", which involved small groups of members of the urban, petit bourgeois intelligentsia going into small villages to persuade peasants of what the nihilists saw as the necessity of revolution. Their efforts had little effect on the peasantry. Afterwards, they adopted terrorist tactics.

== See also ==
- Resource mobilization
- Radicalization
