= DARPA Prize Competitions =

U.S. Government-sponsored prize competitions on innovative technologies

Over the years, the U.S. Defense Advanced Research Projects Agency (DARPA) has conducted numerous prize competitions to spur innovation. A prize competition allows DARPA to establish an ambitious goal, opening the door to novel approaches from the public that might otherwise appear too risky for experts in a particular field to pursue.

== Statutory authorities ==
In 1999, Congress provided prize competition authority to DARPA in the National Defense Authorization Act for Fiscal Year 2000 (P.L. 106–65), 10 U.S.C. § 4025, formerly 10 U.S.C. §2374a. DARPA also conducts prize competitions under the America COMPETES Act, 15 U.S.C. § 3719.

== Recent prize competitions ==
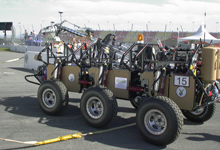
DARPA 2004 Grand Challenge

DARPA Grand Challenge (2004 and 2005) was a prize competition to spur the development of autonomous vehicle technologies. The $1 million prize went unclaimed as no vehicles could complete the challenging desert route from Barstow, CA, to Primm, NV, on March 13, 2004. A year later, on October 8, 2005, the Stanford Racing Team won the $2 million prize during the second competition of the Grand Challenge in the desert Southwest near the California/Nevada state line.

DARPA Urban Challenge (2007) required the competitors to build an autonomous vehicle capable of driving in traffic and performing complex maneuvers such as merging, passing, parking, and negotiating intersections. On November 3, 2007, the Carnegie Mellon Team won the $2 million prize, and its vehicle became the first autonomous vehicle that interacted with both manned and unmanned vehicle traffic in an urban environment.

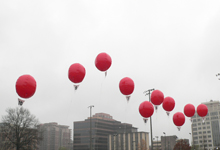
DARPA 2009 Red Balloon Challenge

DARPA Network Challenge (Red Balloon Challenge) (2009) explored the roles that the Internet and social networking play in solving broad-scope, time-critical problems. On December 5, 2009, the Massachusetts Institute of Technology team won $40,000 by locating the ten moored, eight-foot, red weather balloons at ten places in the United States within seven hours.

DARPA Digital Manufacturing Analysis, Correlation and Estimation Challenge (DMACE) (2010) was a three-month contest to showcase the potential of digital manufacturing of advanced materials. The University of California at Santa Barbara team won a $50,000 prize for crushing 180 digitally manufactured (DM) titanium mesh spheres with the most accurate predictive model of the components’ properties.

DARPA Shredder Challenge (2011) was to identify and assess potential capabilities and vulnerabilities to sensitive information in the national security community. Participating teams must download the images of the documents shredded into more than 10,000 pieces from the Challenge website, reconstruct the documents, and solve the five puzzles. Of almost 9,000 teams, the San Francisco-based All Your Shreds Are Belong to U.S team won the $50,000 prize.

DARPA UAVForge Challenge (2011-2012) aimed to build and test a user-intuitive, backpack-portable unmanned aerial vehicle (UAV) that could quietly fly in and out of critical environments to conduct sustained surveillance for up to three hours. The $100,000 prize was not claimed because none of the 140 teams met the technical matrix.

DARPA Cash for Locating & Identifying Quick Response Codes (CLIQR) Quest Challenge (2012) explored the role the Internet and social media played in the timely communication, wide-area team-building, and urgent mobilization required to solve broad scope, time-critical problems. The challenge offered $40,000 to the first individual or team that could locate seven posters appearing in U.S. cities bearing the DARPA logo and a quick response code (QR) within 15 days. No team found and submitted all seven codes.

DARPA Fast Adaptable Next-Generation Ground Vehicle (FANG) Challenge (2012-2013) was to use three competitions for the design of an infantry fighting vehicle, culminating in prototypes. In April 2013, DARPA awarded US$1 million to a three-man team during the first competition. DARPA decided not to proceed with the second and third competitions as originally planned and transitioned the technologies to the defense and commercial industry through the Digital Manufacturing and Design Innovation Institute (DMDII).

DARPA Spectrum Challenge (2013-2014) sought to demonstrate how a software-defined radio can use a given communication channel in the presence of other users and interfering signals. Three teams emerged as the overall winners, winning a total of $150,000 in prizes.

DARPA Chikungunya (CHIKV) Challenge (2014-2015) was a health-related effort to develop the most accurate predictions of CHIKV cases for all Western Hemisphere countries and territories between September 2014 and March 2015. On May 12, 2015, DARPA awarded $500,000 in prizes to the 11 winners of the competition during a scientific review

DARPA Robotics Challenge (DRC) (2013-2015) aimed to develop semi-autonomous ground robots that could do "complex tasks in dangerous, degraded, human-engineered environments." A South Korean team won the first prize of $2 million, and two U.S. teams won $1 million and $500,000 as second and third winners.

DARPA Cyber Grand Challenge (CGC) (2014 - 2016) was to “create automatic defensive systems capable of reasoning about flaws, formulating patches and deploying them on a network in real time.” The top three winners were awarded prizes of $2 million, $1 million, and $750,000, respectively.

DARPA Spectrum Collaboration Challenge (SC2) (2016-2019) aimed to encourage the development of AI-enabled wireless networks to “ensure that the exponentially growing number of military and civilian wireless devices would have full access to the increasingly crowded electromagnetic spectrum.” A team from the University of Florida won the overall top prize of US$2 million at the final SC2 competition.

DARPA Subterranean (SubT) Challenge (2017-2021) was to develop robotic technologies to map, navigate, search and exploit complex underground environments. The first-place winners of the system final competition and of the virtual final competition were awarded $2 million and $750,000, respectively, with multiple prizes awarded to the second and third-place winners.

DARPA Launch Challenge (2018-2020) was a $12 million satellite launch challenge to demonstrate responsive and flexible space launch capabilities from the small launch providers and was to culminate in two separate launch competitions where the competitors must launch a satellite to low Earth orbit (LEO) within days of each other at different locations in the United States. The competition ended without a winner.

DARPA Forecasting Floats in Turbulence (FFT) Challenge (2021) was to spur technologies that could predict the location of sea drifters or floats within 10 days. DARPA awarded $25,000 for first place, with prizes of $15,000 and $10,000 for second place and third place.

DARPA Artificial Intelligence Cyber Challenge (AIxCC) (2023–2025) was a two-year challenge and asks competitors to design novel AI systems to secure critical software code on which Americans rely. The total prize money is $29.5 million. In March 2024, the Advanced Research Projects Agency for Health (ARPA-H) partnered with DARPA, contributing an additional $20 million to the competition's prize pool to address software vulnerabilities in medical devices, hospital IT, and biotech equipment. AIxCC collaborates with Google, Microsoft, OpenAI, Anthropic, Linux Foundation, Open Source Security Foundation, Black Hat USA, and DEF CON, all of which provide AIxCC with access to large language models. In August 2024, AIxCC held the semifinal at DEF CON in Las Vegas. DARPA and ARPA-H tested all 42 submissions by running them through various open-source coding projects with deliberately injected vulnerabilities and scored the tools based on their effectiveness in identifying and fixing security flaws. Seven teams, each winning $2 million in the semifinals, competed in the final round of the AIxCC at the August 2025 DEF CON conference. Team Atlanta won first place with a $4 million prize for its cyber reasoning systems, which identified and patched vulnerabilities across 54 million lines of code.

DARPA Triage Challenge (2023 – 2026) aims to spur the development of novel physiological features for medical triage, with a total prize money of $7 million. In October 2024, Challenge Event 1 was held in Perry, Georgia, featuring to-scale replicas of disaster sites such as an airplane crash and Hurricane Katrina, and teams competed based on how closely their data aligned with the agency’s official data and how quickly and accurately their autonomous systems could identify individuals most urgently in need of medical care. DARPA concluded the second year of competitions and, in November 2025, named the top performers in systems and data categories, which will advance to the final 2026 competition.

The DARPA Lift Challenge (2025-2026) is for participants to design unmanned aerial systems capable of carrying up to four times their own weight, with a minimum payload of 110 pounds. According to DARPA, the current payload-to-weight ratio for most small drones is typically one-to-two or lower. In August 2026, AVIDrone, Inc. won $1,250,000 with an unprecedented payload-to-weight ratio of 3.84 to 1. The second-place winner, Massachusetts-based MTech Operations, won $750,000 for lifting 3.64 to 1; and the third-place winner, California-based Xtreme Aerial Concepts, was awarded $500,000 for lifting 3.45 to 1.

DARPA Surgical Competition (2026-2027) was launched in September 2026. It is a $3.5 million prize competition to develop robotic systems capable of assisting human surgeons and autonomously performing trauma surgery during combat and mass-casualty events., with the final competition scheduled for March 2027.

== See also ==
- DARPA
- DARPA Grand Challenge
- Adaptive Vehicle Make
- DARPA Network Challenge (Red Balloon Challenge)
- DARPA Shredder Challenge
- DARPA Spectrum Challenge
- DARPA Robotics Challenge
- DARPA Cyber Grand Challenge
