= MyHeartMap Challenge =

Research study by University of Pennsylvania

The MyHeartMap Challenge is a community improvement initiative and part of a research study being conducted at the University of Pennsylvania to map automated external defibrillators (AEDs) in the city of Philadelphia.

== Challenge description ==
The challenge takes the form of a contest wherein the person or team to find and report the locations of the maximum number of AED devices in the city gets a grand prize of USD 10,000, provided at least 750 AEDs are reported in total or 500 AEDs are reported by a single team. 20 to 200 "Golden" AEDs have also been identified in advance, photos of which will gain the submitter a USD 50 prize. The challenge runs from January 31 through March 13 of the year 2012. The challenge has drawn interested from various quarters, including academic institutions who are participating with the aim to build up and study a more intelligent crowdsourcing campaign.

=== Crowdsourcing ===
The MyHeartMap Challenge is an example of crowdsourcing, an approach to accomplishing tasks by opening them to the public. The organizers of the challenge were inspired by the DARPA Network Challenge, in which teams completed to locate 10 red weather balloons placed at random locations all over the United States. According to the MyHeartMap Challenge Director Dr. Raina Merchant, "DARPA succeeded with locating red balloons. AEDs are a natural extension of a brilliant idea."

== Teams ==
Given the scale of the challenge, the most likely winner is going to be a team rather than an individual. A global effort to assemble a large team is underway, organized by computer scientists from MIT, UCSD, Masdar Institute, and University of Southampton. The team, dubbed HeartCrowd, includes some of the winners of the DARPA Network Challenge, which inspired the MyHeartMap Challenge.

== Outcome ==
The challenge officially ended on Tuesday, March 27, 2012, and the individuals were announced several weeks after.

According to the organizers, over 1,500 AEDs were submitted from 300 teams and individuals.
