= Chaparral Lake =

Waterbody and park in Scottsdale, Arizona, US

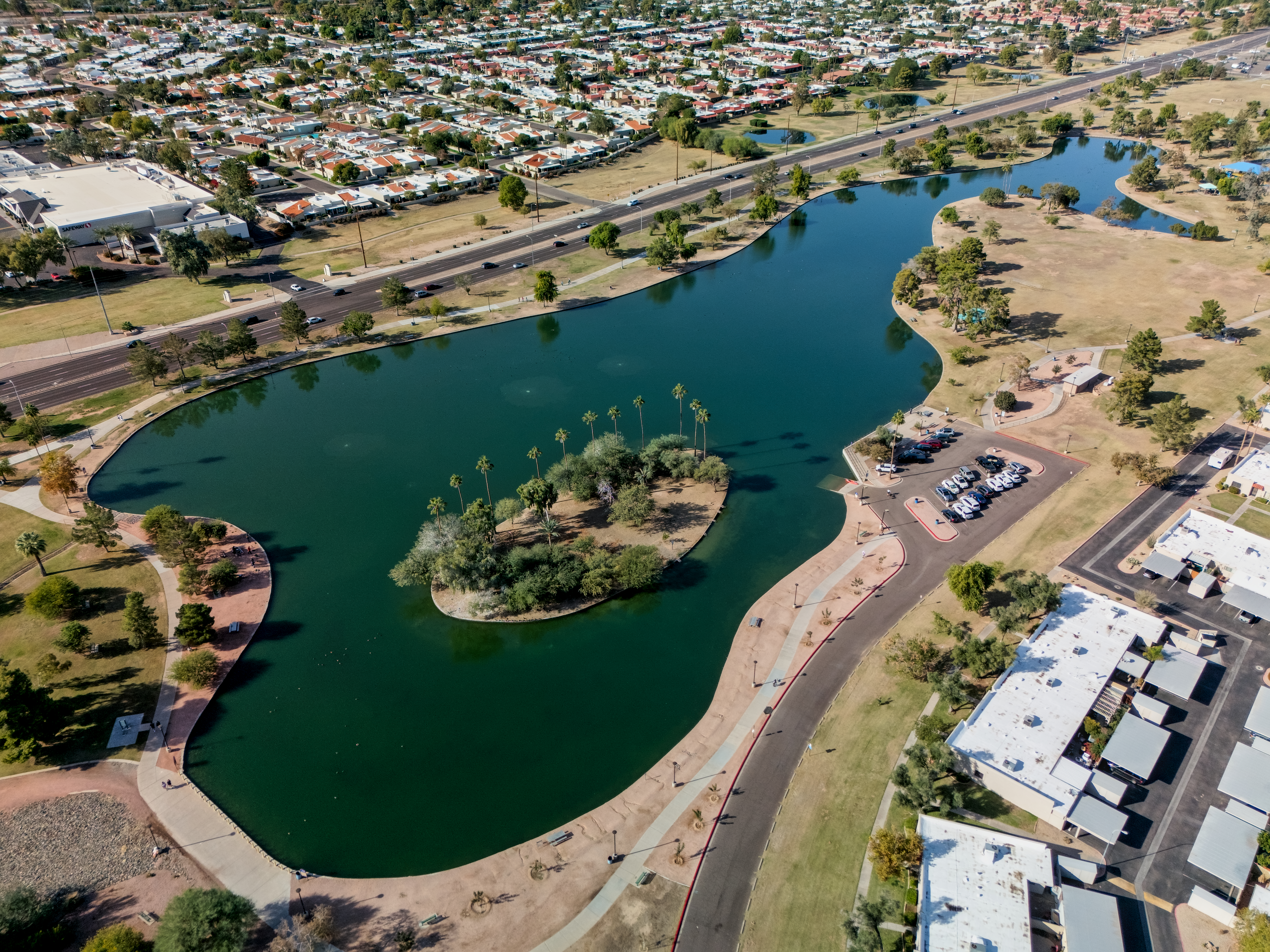
- Aerial view of Chaparral Lake

- Location within Arizona
- Location: Scottsdale, Arizona
- Coordinates: 33°30′38″N 111°54′27″W
- Basin countries: United States
- Surface area: 10 acres (4.0 ha)
- Average depth: 10 ft (3.0 m)
- Surface elevation: 1,100 ft (340 m)

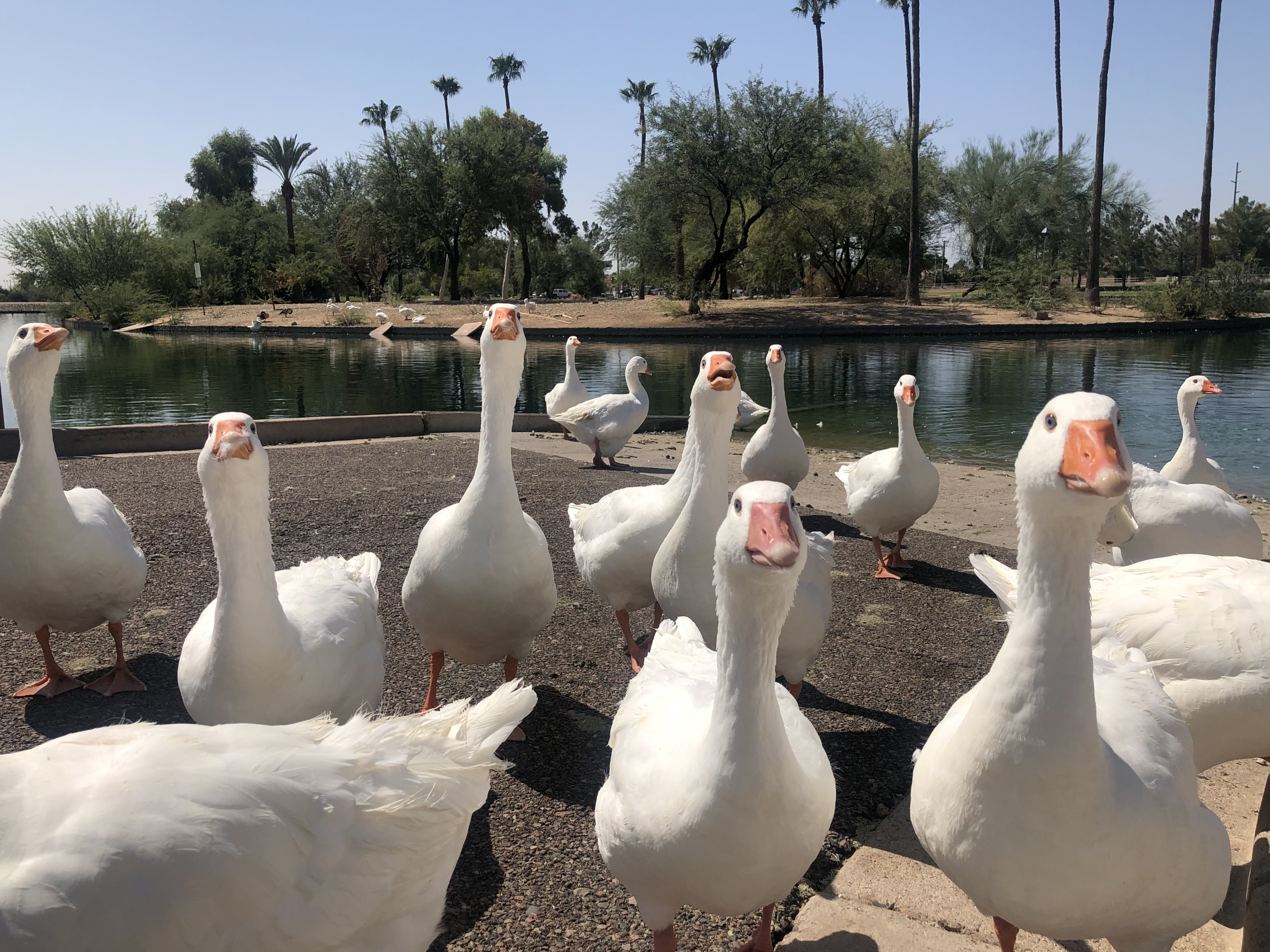
Chaparral Park

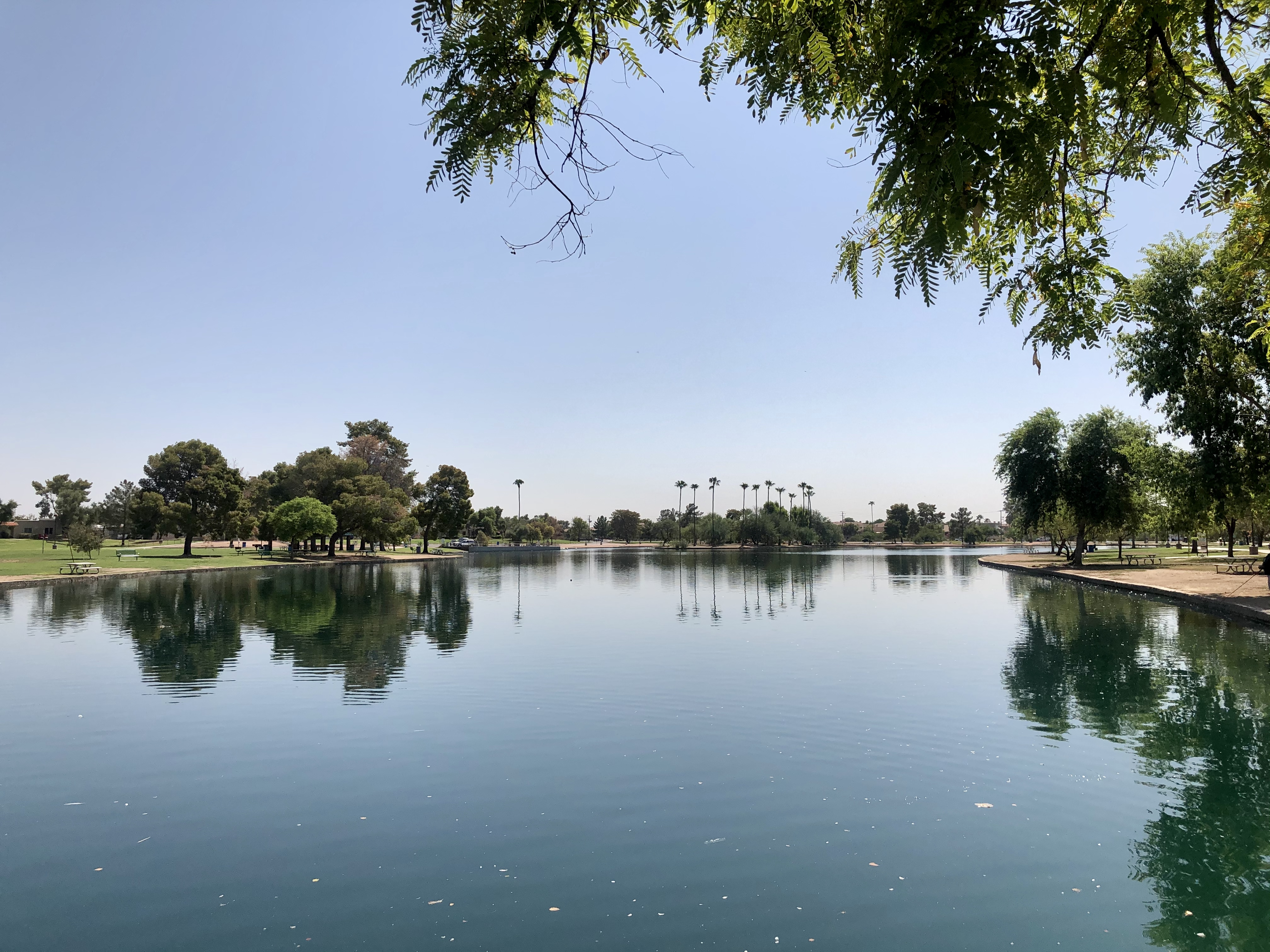
Chaparral Lake

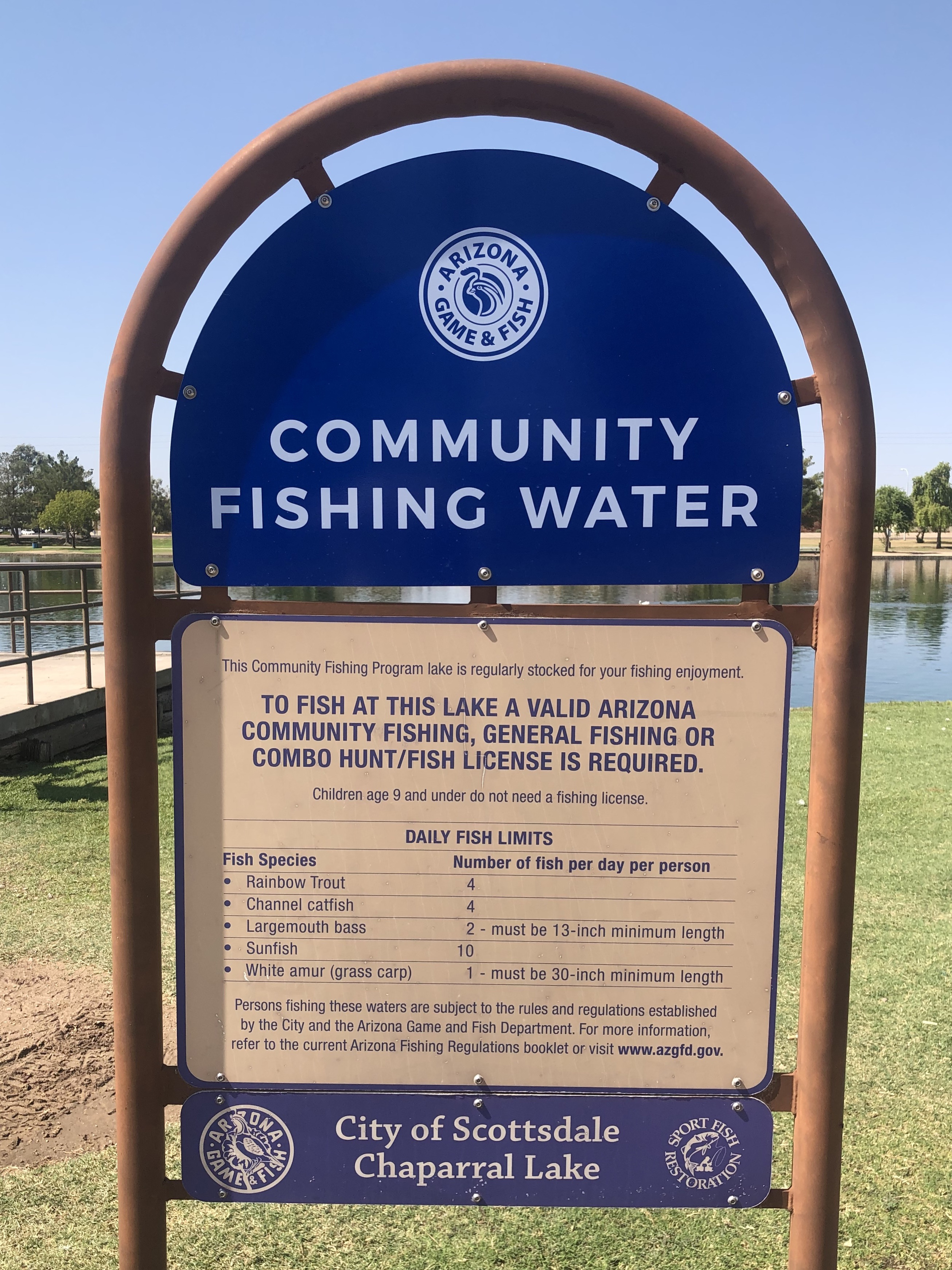
Chaparral Lake is a community fishing water.

Chaparral Lake is located in Chaparral Park in west Scottsdale, Arizona, United States, at the northeast corner of Hayden and Chaparral Roads. It was the location of Balloon 2 in the 2009 DARPA Network Challenge.

== Fish species ==
- Rainbow trout
- Largemouth bass
- Sunfish
- Catfish (channel)
- Catfish (flathead)
- Tilapia
- Carp
