= Paper shredder =

Device used to cut paper into pieces

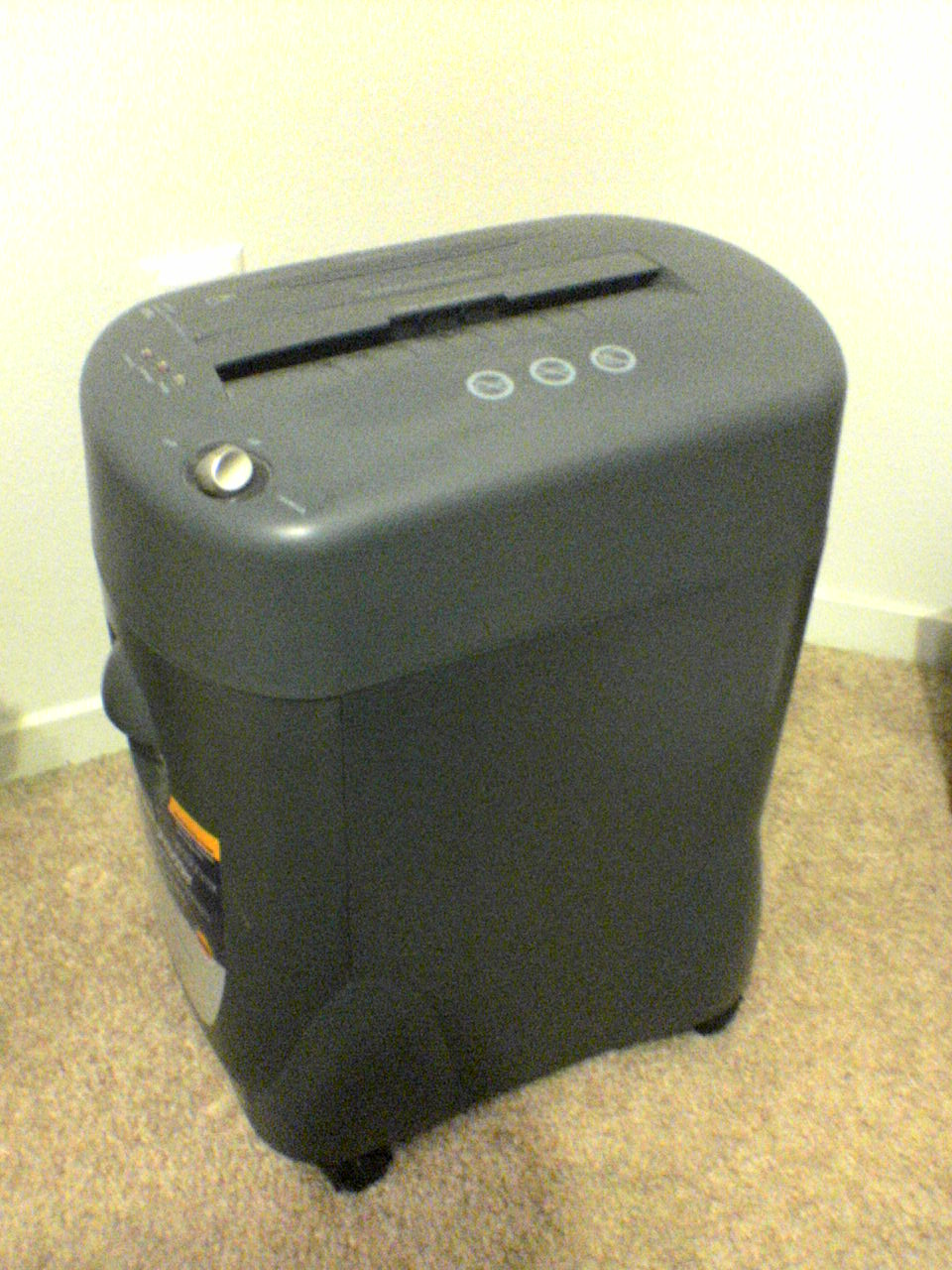
Paper shredder with built-in wastebasket

A shredded document

A paper shredder is a mechanical device used to cut sheets of paper into strips or fine particles. Government organizations, businesses, and private individuals use shredders to destroy private, confidential, or otherwise sensitive documents.

== History ==
=== Invention ===
The paper shredder was invented by Abbot Augustus Low, whose patent was filed on February 2, 1909. His invention was never manufactured because he died prematurely soon after filing the patent.

Adolf Ehinger's paper shredder, based on a hand-crank pasta maker, was the first to be manufactured, in 1935, in Germany. He created a machine to shred his anti-Nazi leaflets to avoid inquiries from the authorities. Ehinger later marketed and began selling his patented shredders to government agencies and financial institutions switching from hand-crank to electric motor shredders. Ehinger's company, EBA Maschinenfabrik, manufactured the first cross-cut paper shredders in 1959 and continues to do so today as EBA Krug & Priester GmbH & Co. in Balingen.

A "wet shredder" was invented in the former German Democratic Republic. To prevent paper shredders in the Stasi from becoming glutted, this device mashed paper snippets with water.

With a shift from paper to digital document production, modern industrial shredders have been designed to process non-paper media, such as credit cards and CDs.

=== Applications ===
Until the mid-1980s, it was rare for paper shredders to be used by non-government entities.

A prominent example of their use was when the U.S. embassy in Iran used shredders to destroy documents before the embassy was taken over in 1979. Some documents were reconstructed from the strips, as detailed below.

After Colonel Oliver North told Congress that he used a Schleicher cross-cut model to shred Iran-Contra documents, its sales increased nearly 20 percent in 1987.

Paper shredders became more popular among U.S. citizens with privacy concerns after the 1988 Supreme Court decision in California v. Greenwood, in which the Supreme Court of the United States held that the Fourth Amendment does not prohibit the warrantless search and seizure of garbage left for collection outside of a home. Anti-burning laws also resulted in increased demand for paper shredding.

More recently, concerns about identity theft have driven increased personal use of paper shredders, with the US Federal Trade Commission recommending that individuals shred financial documents before disposal.

Information privacy laws such as FACTA, HIPAA, and the Gramm–Leach–Bliley Act drive shredder usage, as businesses and individuals take steps to securely dispose of confidential information.

== Types ==
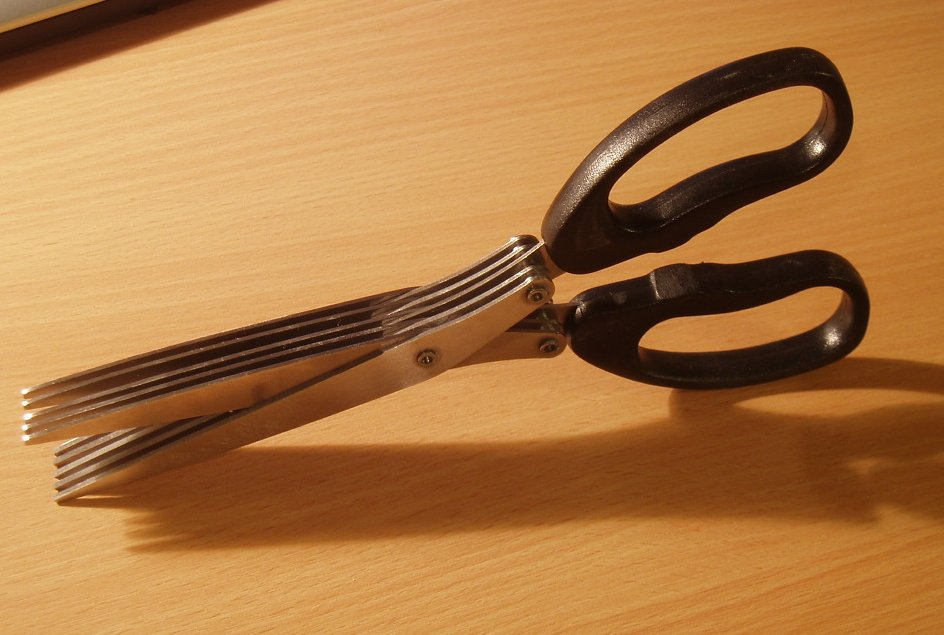
Multi-cut scissors used to shred paper

Shredders range in size and price. Small, inexpensive units are designed for individual use. Large, expensive units are used by commercial shredding services and can shred millions of documents per hour. While small shredders may be hand-cranked, most shredders are electric.

Over time, new features were added to improve user experience, including rejecting paper when over capacity to avoid jams, and other safety features. Some shredders designed for use in shared workspaces or department copy rooms have noise reduction.

=== Mobile shredding truck ===
Large organizations or shredding services sometimes use "mobile shredding trucks", typically constructed as a box truck with an industrial-size paper shredder mounted inside with storage space for shredded materials. Such units may also provide the shredding of CDs, DVDs, hard drives, credit cards, and uniforms, among other things.

=== Kiosks ===
A "shredding kiosk" is an automated retail machine (or kiosk) that allows public access to a commercial or industrial-capacity paper shredder. This is an alternative to the use of a personal or business paper shredder, and where the public can pay for each use rather than purchasing shredding equipment.

=== Services ===
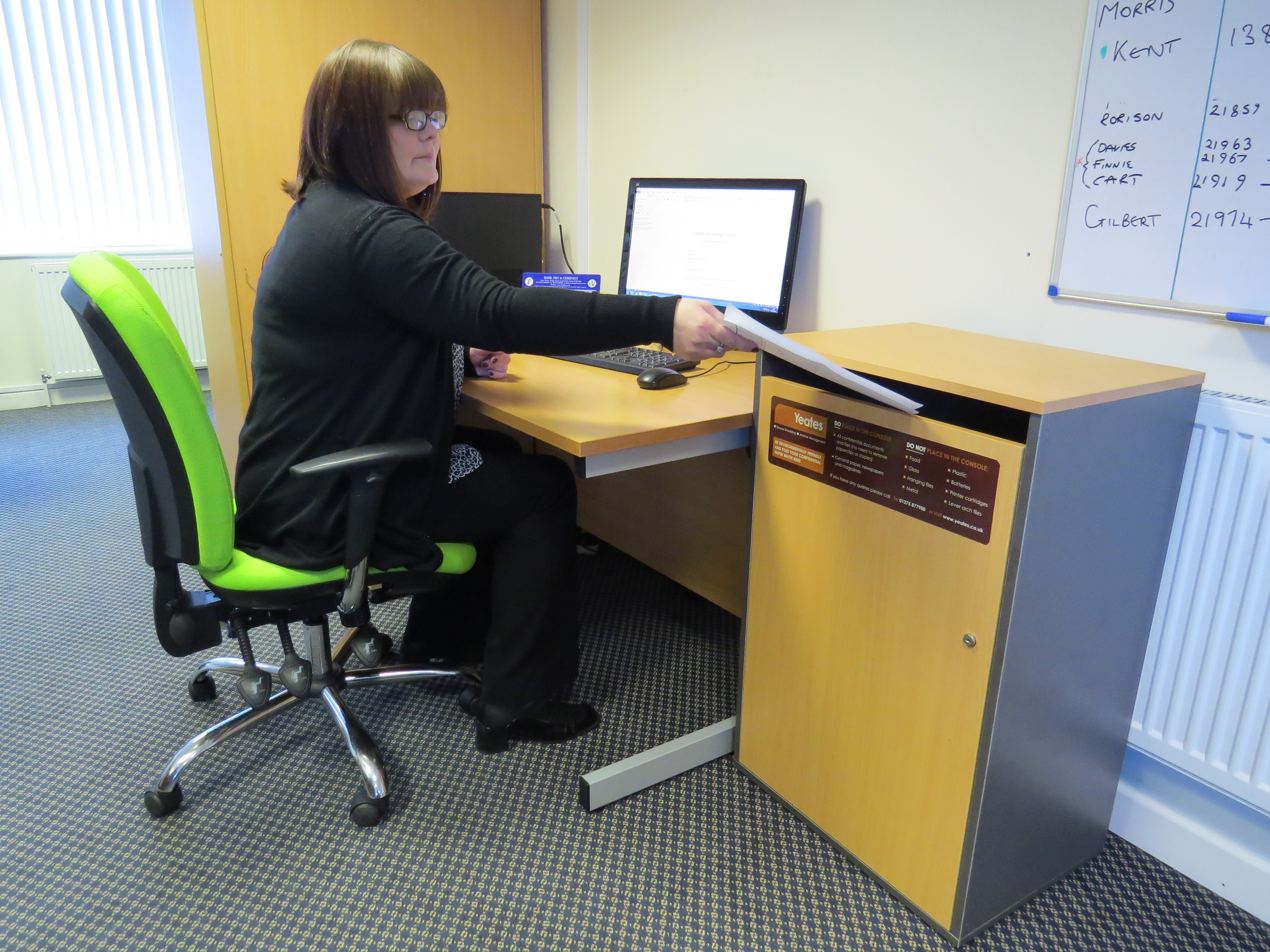
Shredding console

Some companies outsource their shredding to "shredding services". These companies either shred on-site, with mobile shredder trucks, or have off-site shredding facilities. Documents slated for shredding are often placed in locked bins that are emptied periodically.

== Shredding method and output ==
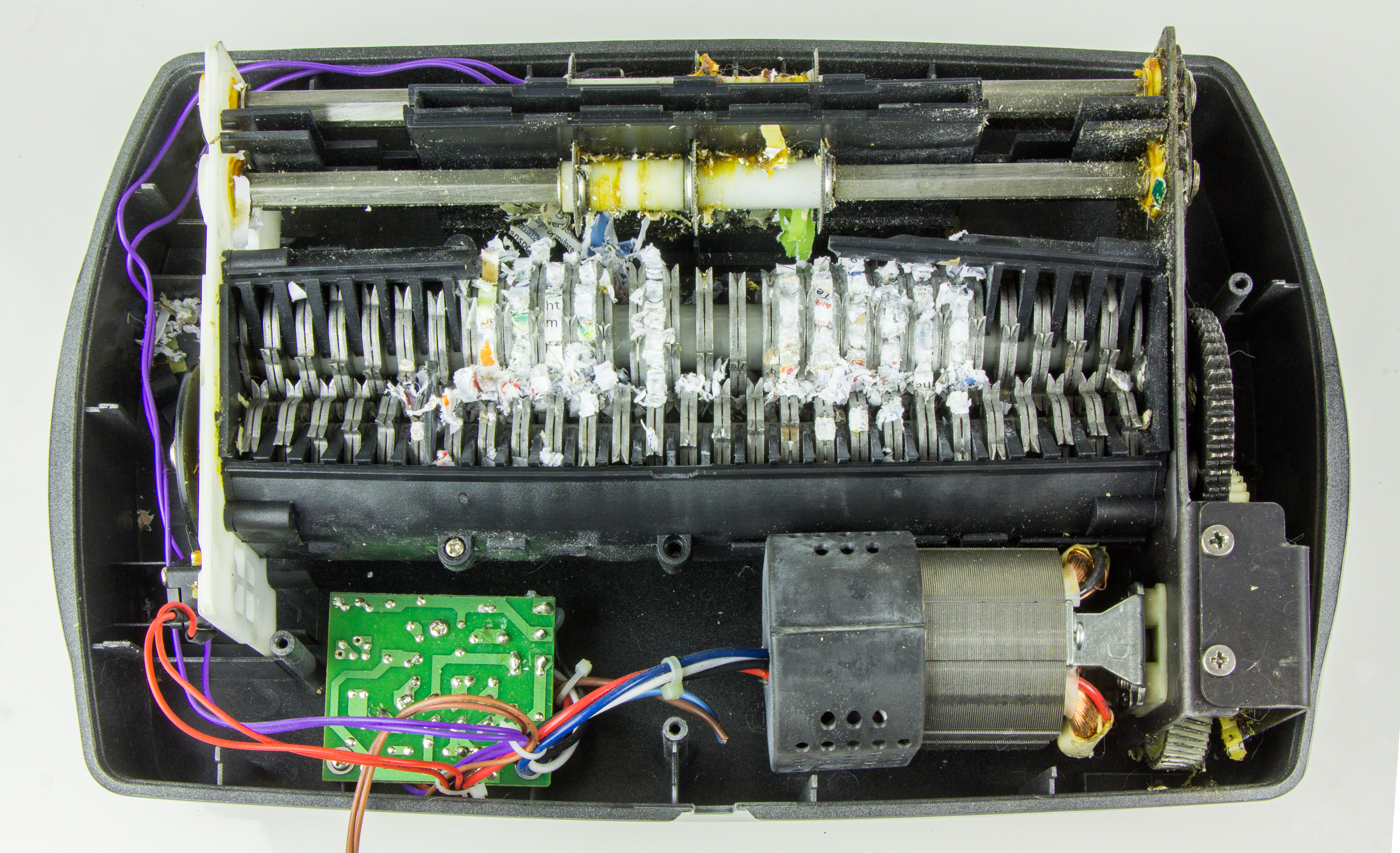
Inner view of a paper shredder with motor

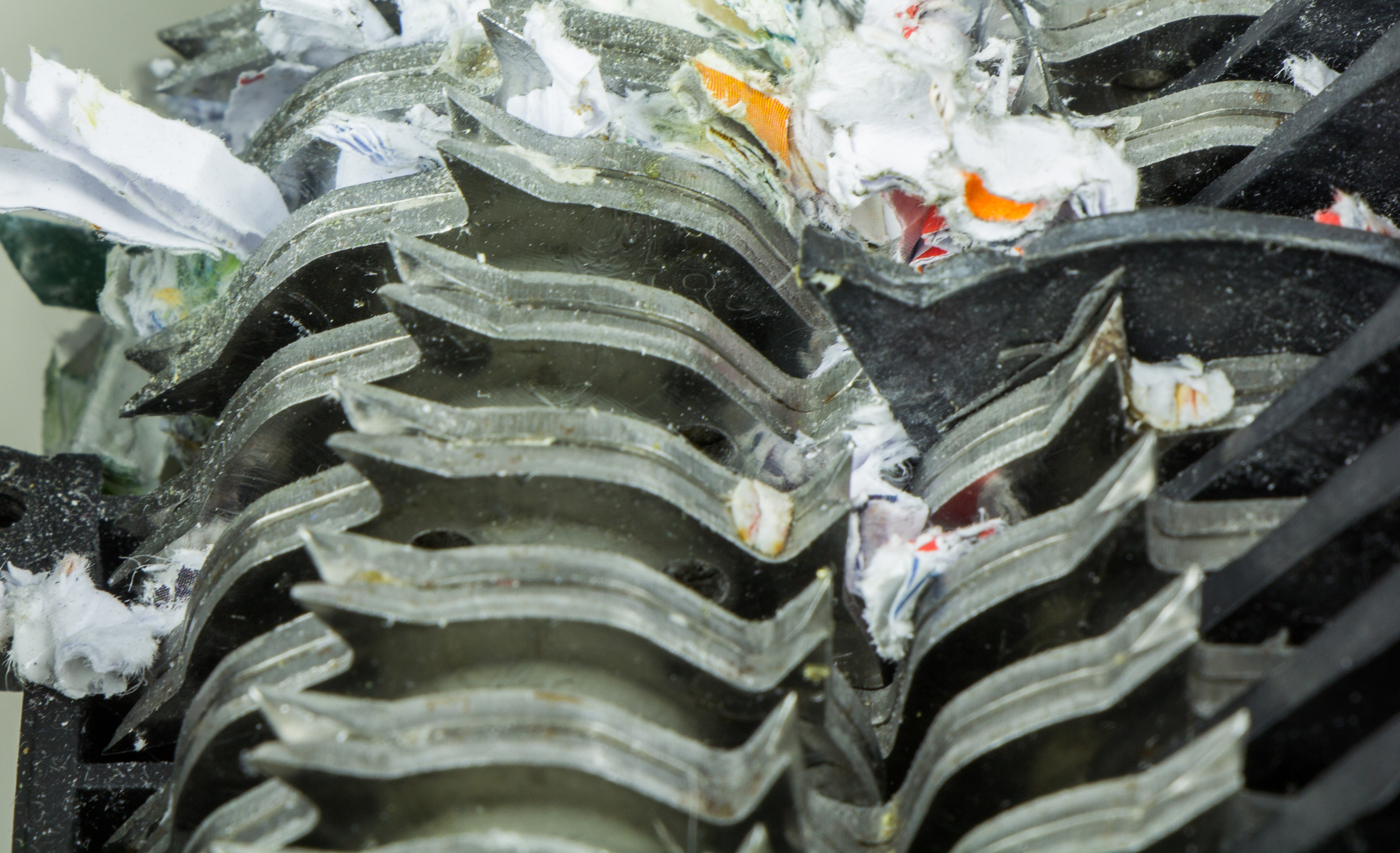
Detail of a cross-cut paper shredder

As well as size and capacity, shredders are classified according to the method they use and the size and shape of the shreds they produce.

- Strip-cut shredders use rotating knives to cut narrow strips as long as the original sheet of paper.
- Cross-cut or confetti-cut shredders use two contra-rotating drums to cut rectangular, parallelogram, or lozenge (diamond-shaped) shreds.
- Particle-cut or Micro-cut shredders create tiny square or circular pieces.
- Cardboard shredders are designed specifically to shred corrugated material into either strips or a mesh pallet.
- Disintegrators and granulators repeatedly cut the paper at random intervals with rotating knives in a drum until the particles are small enough to pass through a fine mesh.
- Hammermills pound the paper through a screen.
- Pierce-and-tear shredders have rotating blades that pierce the paper and then tear it apart.
- Grinders have a rotating shaft with cutting blades that grind the paper into pieces small enough to fall through a screen.

=== Security levels ===
There are standards covering the security levels of paper shredders, including:

==== Deutsches Institut für Normung (DIN) ====
The DIN 66399 standard is as follows:

- Level P-1 = ≤ 2,000 mm^{2} particles or ≤ 12 mm wide strips of any length (for shredding general internal documents such as instructions, forms, expired notices)
- Level P-2 = ≤ 800 mm^{2} particles or ≤ 6 mm wide strips of any length
- Level P-3 = ≤ 320 mm^{2} particles or ≤ 2 mm wide strips of any length (for highly sensitive documents and personal data subject to high protection requirements, purchase order, order confirmations, or delivery notes with address data)
- Level P-4 = ≤ 160 mm^{2} particles with width ≤ 6 mm (particularly sensitive and confidential data, working documents, customer/client data, invoices, private tax and financial documents)
- Level P-5 = ≤ 30 mm^{2} particles with width ≤ 2 mm (data that must be kept secret, balance sheets and profit-and-loss statements, strategy papers, design and engineering documents, personal data)
- Level P-6 = ≤ 10 mm^{2} particles with width ≤ 1 mm (secret, classified data, patents, research and development documents)
- Level P-7 = ≤ 5 mm^{2} particles with width ≤ 1 mm (top secret, highly classified data used by the military, embassies, intelligence services)

==== NSA/CSS ====
The United States National Security Agency and Central Security Service produce "NSA/CSS Specification 02-01 for High Security Crosscut Paper Shredders", which provides a list of evaluated shredders.

==== ISO/IEC ====
The International Organization for Standardization and the International Electrotechnical Commission produce "ISO/IEC 21964 Information technology — Destruction of data carriers". The General Data Protection Regulation (GDPR), which came into force in May 2018, regulates the handling and processing of personal data. ISO/IEC 21964 and DIN 66399 support data protection in business processes.

== Destruction of evidence ==
There have been many instances where it was alleged that documents were improperly or illegally destroyed by shredding, including:

- Oliver North shredded documents relating to the Iran–Contra affair between November 21 and November 25, 1986. During the trial, North testified that on November 21, 22, or 24, he witnessed John Poindexter destroy what may have been the only signed copy of a presidential covert action finding that sought to authorize CIA participation in the November 1985 Hawk missile shipment to Iran.
- According to the report of the Paul Volcker Committee, between April and December 2004 Kofi Annan's Chef de Cabinet, Iqbal Riza, authorized thousands of United Nations documents shredded, including the entire chronological files of the Oil-for-Food Programme during the years 1997 through 1999.
- The Union Bank of Switzerland used paper shredders to destroy evidence that their company owned property stolen from Jews during the Holocaust by the Nazi government. The shredding was disclosed to the public through the work of Christoph Meili, a security guard working at the bank who happened to wander by a room where the shredding was taking place. Also in the shredding room were books from the German Reichsbank. They listed stock accounts for companies involved in the holocaust, including BASF, Degussa, and Degesch. They also listed real-estate records for Berlin properties that had been forcibly taken by the Nazis, placed in Swiss accounts, and then claimed to be owned by UBS. Destruction of such documents was a violation of Swiss laws.

== Unshredding and forensics ==
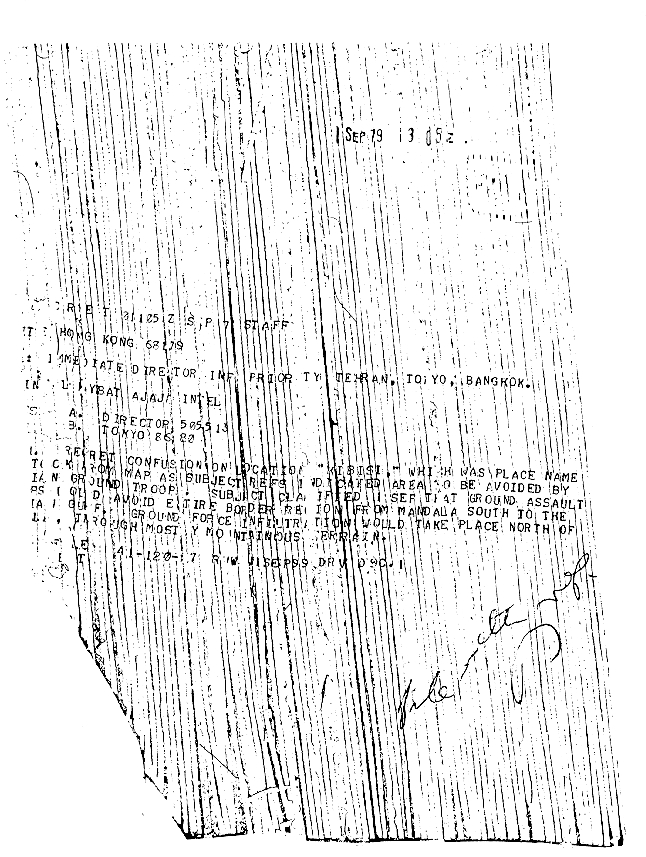
An example of a shredded and reassembled document during the Iran hostage crisis

For paper shredders to achieve their purpose, it should not be possible to reassemble and read shredded documents. In practice, this depends on how well the shredding has been done, and the resources put into reconstruction. The amount of effort put into reconstruction often depends on the importance of the document, e.g. whether it is a simple personal matter, corporate espionage, a criminal matter, or a matter of national security.

The difficulty of reconstruction can depend on the size and legibility of the text, whether the document is single- or double-sided, the size and shape of the shredded pieces, the orientation of the material when fed, how effectively the shredded material is further randomized afterwards, and whether other processes such as pulping and chemical decomposition are used. Even without a full reconstruction, in some cases useful information can be obtained by forensic analysis of the paper, ink, and cutting method.

=== Reconstruction examples ===
- After the Iranian Revolution and the takeover of the U.S. embassy in Tehran in 1979, Iranians enlisted local carpet weavers who reconstructed the pieces by hand. The recovered documents would be later released by the Iranian government in a series of books called "Documents from the U.S. Espionage Den". The US government subsequently improved its shredding techniques by adding pulverizing, pulping, and chemical decomposition protocols.
- Modern computer technology considerably speeds up the process of reassembling shredded documents. The strips are scanned on both sides, and then a computer determines how the strips should be put together. Robert Johnson of the National Association for Information Destruction has stated that there is a huge demand for document reconstruction. Several companies offer commercial document reconstruction services. For maximum security, documents should be shredded so that the words of the document go through the shredder horizontally (i.e. perpendicular to the blades). Many of the documents in the Enron Accounting scandals were fed through the shredder the wrong way, making them easier to reassemble.
- In 2003, there was an effort underway to recover the shredded archives of the Stasi, the East German secret police. There are "millions of shreds of paper that panicked Stasi officials threw into garbage bags during the regime's final days in the fall of 1989". As it took three dozen people six years to reconstruct 300 of the 16,000 bags, the Fraunhofer-IPK institute has developed the Stasi-Schnipselmaschine ("Stasi snippet machine") for computerized reconstruction and is testing it in a pilot project.
- The DARPA Shredder Challenge 2011 called upon computer scientists, puzzle enthusiasts, and anyone else with an interest in solving complex problems, to compete for up to $50,000 by piecing together a series of shredded documents. The Shredder Challenge consisted of five separate puzzles in which the number of documents, the document subject matter, and the method of shredding were varied to present challenges of increasing difficulty. To complete each problem, participants were required to provide the answer to a puzzle embedded in the content of the reconstructed document. The overall prizewinner and prize awarded was dependent on the number and difficulty of the problems solved. DARPA declared a winner on December 2, 2011. The winning entry, submitted by "All Your Shreds Are Belong To U.S." 33 days after the challenge began, used a combination system that used automated sorting to pick the best fragment combinations to be reviewed by humans.

=== Forensic identification ===
The individual shredder that was used to destroy a given document may sometimes be of forensic interest. Shredders display certain device-specific characteristics, "fingerprints", like the exact spacing of the blades, the degree and pattern of their wear. Through close examination of the minute variations in size of the paper strips and the microscopic marks on their edges, the shredded material may be linked to a specific machine. (cf. the forensic identification of typewriters.)

== Recycling of waste ==
The resulting shredded paper can be recycled in a number of ways, including:

- Animal bedding – to produce a warm and comfortable bed for animals
- Void fill and packaging – void fill for the transportation of goods
- Briquettes – an alternative to non-renewable fuels
- Insulation – shredded newsprint mixed with flame-retardant chemicals and glue to create a sprayable insulation material for wall interiors and the underside of roofing

== See also ==
- Baler
- Industrial shredder
- Paper recycling
- Used note
