= Used note =

Banknote in circulation

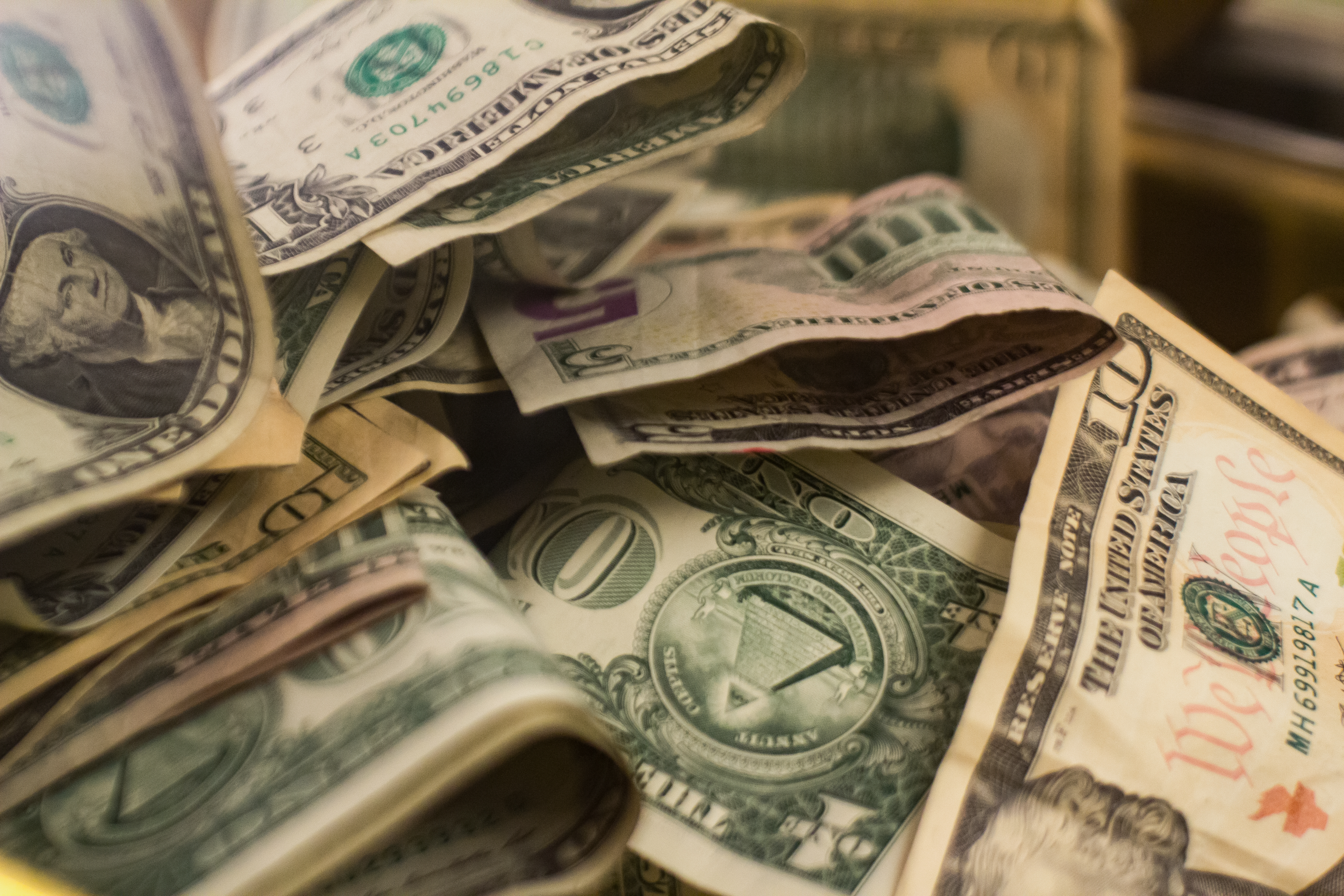
Used dollar bills showing signs of wear consistent with circulation

A used note is a banknote that has been in circulation (as opposed to a freshly printed, uncirculated banknote). Blackmailers and people demanding ransoms are often heard in movies to ask for a sum of money "in used notes". Used banknotes are preferred by criminals because they are more difficult to trace. Blocks of new banknotes will be in sequentially numbered order.

Used bank notes, due to their being in circulation for however long, are eventually processed by high speed automatic machines which check the quality of the note. In some cases, the note is destroyed and the original entity from which it came from receives a new note or equivalent value check.

== Collectibility ==
Used bank notes are less desired by collectors in comparison to uncirculated bank notes. However, many old, rare bank notes are valuable to collectors when uncirculated notes are not available at an affordable price.

== Removal from Circulation (United States) ==
In the United States, when the quality of a used note becomes sufficiently degraded, it is removed from circulation by the Federal Reserve. Each Federal Reserve Bank operates numerous count rooms, in which at least two employees process banknotes that were received on deposit from a bank. Used banknotes are fed into a large counting machine, which verifies the amount of the deposit and also identifies degraded banknotes. Any banknotes not meeting certain quality standards are immediately shredded by the machine. The shredded remains of used banknotes are sometimes offered for purchase as a novelty item. Individuals who have in their possession a note which is sufficiently damaged or worn may submit the note to the Bureau of Engraving and Printing who will examine the note and if necessary return a check of equivalent payment to the individual.
