= Benjamin Tonsler Park (Charlottesville) =

Park in Virginia, United States

Coordinates: 38°1′34″N 78°29′28″W

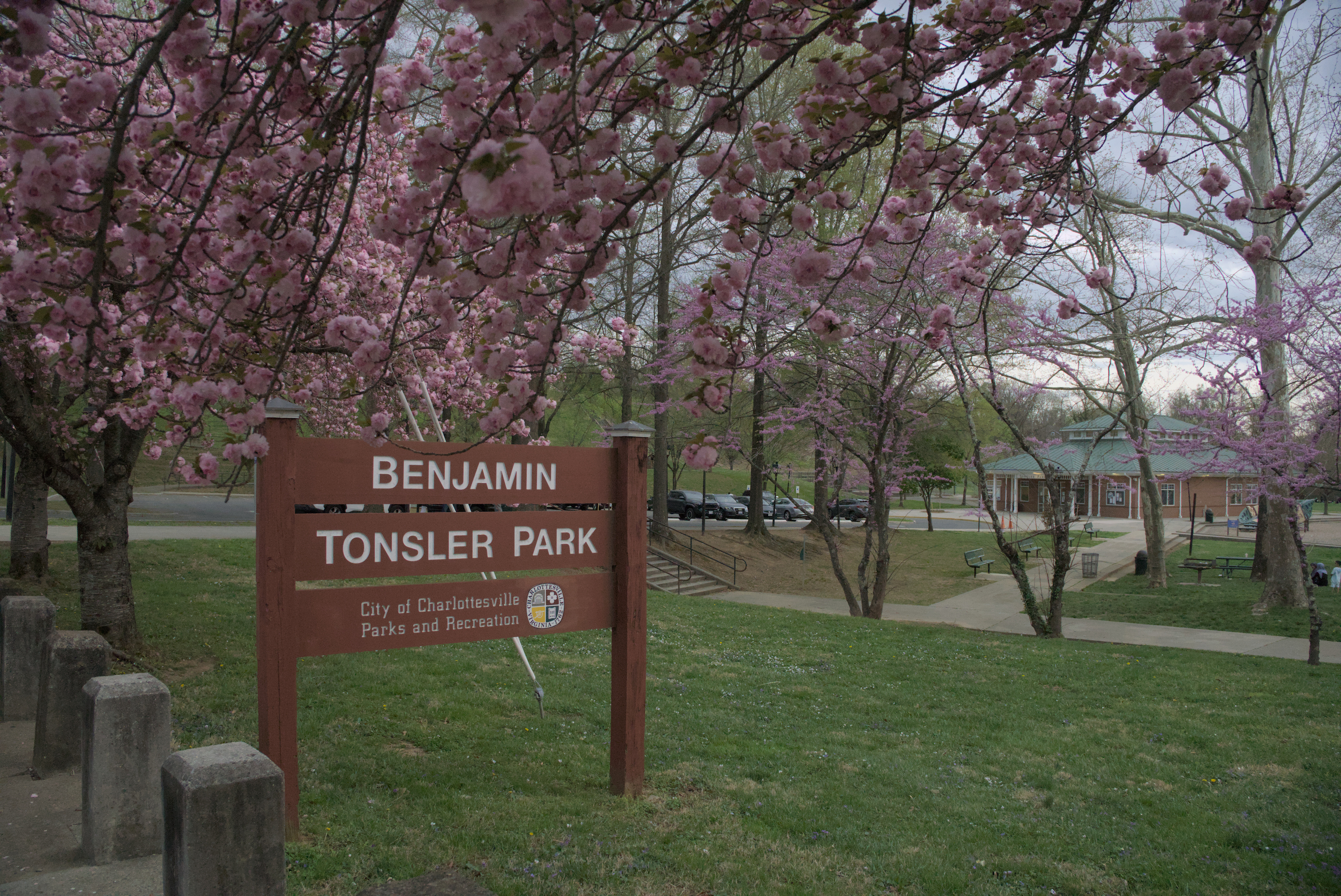
- Interactive map of Benjamin Tonsler Park
- Location: Charlottesville, Virginia
- Area: 8.72 acres (3.53 ha)
- Created: 1946

Benjamin Tonsler Park is a park in Charlottesville, Virginia. It was the location of Balloon 3 in the 2009 DARPA Network Challenge.

== Benjamin Tonsler ==
Benjamin Tonsler was one of Charlottesville's most prominent African American citizens. Very little is known of his early life. He was born April 2, 1854, in Albemarle County. In later years his descendants came to believe that a member of a family for whom he worked taught him to read and write, which was illegal at the time.

Whatever the circumstance of his early life, Mr. Tonsler went on to become a noted teacher, principal and citizen. He was educated at Hampton University and returned to Charlottesville to teach at the Jefferson Graded School, which at that time was the only school available to African Americans. He taught for several years and then assumed the position of principal, which he held for almost thirty years. His students remembered him as a stern disciplinarian who took huge risks to further their education. Under the segregated laws of the time it was illegal to educate African American students past eighth grade. Mr. Tonsler had his older students stay after school to study more advanced texts with the understanding that the books were to be hidden whenever the white Superintendent appeared for an inspection. In this secretive manner many students were able to complete coursework that prepared them to enter college.

Mr. Tonsler was a close friend of Booker T. Washington whom he met while in college, and Mr. Washington stayed at his home on his way to Tuskegee to assume the presidency of the Tuskegee Institute (now Tuskegee University). Mr. Tonsler's home was located not far from the park which now bears his name: Tonsler Park, which the city created in 1946.

Benjamin Tonsler died on March 6, 1917, at age 63 after a short illness. He is buried at Oakwood Cemetery next to his wife, Fannie Gildersleeve Tonsler.
