= DARPA Shredder Challenge 2011 =

Competition about reconstructing shredded documents

DARPA Shredder Challenge 2011 was a prize competition for exploring methods to reconstruct documents shredded by a variety of paper shredding techniques. The aim of the challenge was to "assess potential capabilities that could be used by the U.S. warfighters operating in war zones, but might also identify vulnerabilities to sensitive information that is protected by shredding practices throughout the U.S. national security community". The competition was sponsored by the Defense Advanced Research Projects Agency (DARPA), a research organization of the United States Department of Defense. Congress authorized DARPA to award cash prizes to further DARPA’s mission to sponsor revolutionary, high-payoff research that bridges the gap between fundamental discoveries and their use for national security.

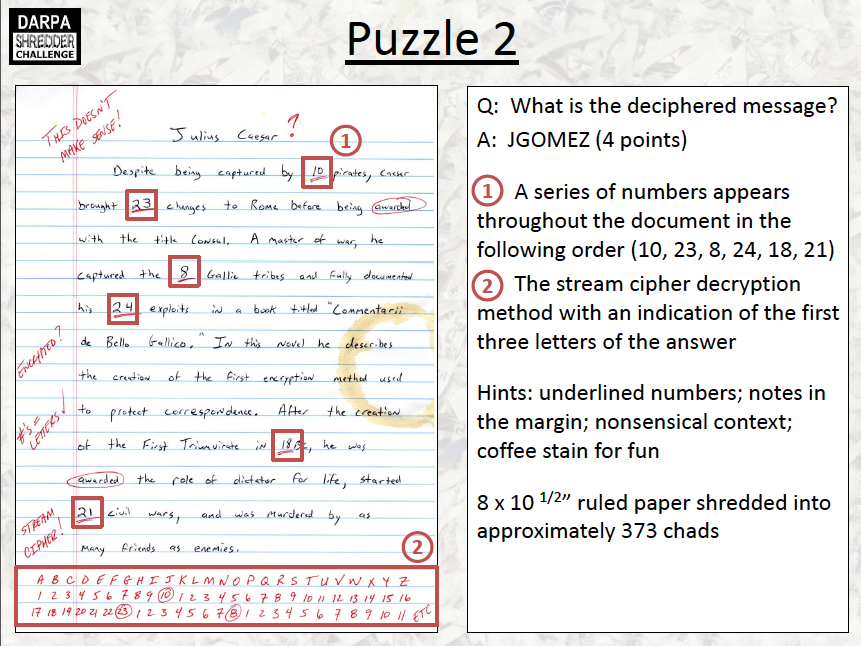
As an example, solution of puzzle 2 from the DARPA Shredder Challenge.

Under the rules of the competition, the $50,000 challenge award would be granted to the first team to submit the answers to questions relating to a hidden mystery. The mystery verified that the team was able to extract meaningful intelligence from the page that was thought destroyed. The secret answers could be acquired by reconstructing five individual puzzles that were created by shredding one or more single-sided hand-written documents.

In addition to the Shredder Challenge, DARPA has also conducted prize competitions in other areas of technology.

== Winning team ==
Nearly 9,000 teams participated between 12:00PM EDT on October 27, 2011, and the deadline of 11:59PM EST on December 4, 2011, with the San Francisco-based team "All Your Shreds are Belong to U.S." winning the competition three days ahead of schedule.

The team used a combination of techniques to solve the puzzles: custom-coded computer-vision algorithms were created to suggest fragment pairings to human assemblers for verification. The eight-person team led by a technology entrepreneur Otavio Good also included Keith Walker, Winnie Tong, Luke Alonso, Zina Tebaykina, and Sohana Ahmed with two more persons joining to help in the end. The team's three programmers had strong image-processing skills that enabled them to win this challenge: at the time of DARPA Shredder Challenge 2011, Otavio Good was leading the development of the visual translation tool Word Lens, Luke Alonso was a developer of the mobile phone application "Cabana", and Keith Walker was a programmer working on a satellite software at Lockheed Martin.

Approximately 600 worker-hours were dedicated by the team to reconstruct five documents shredded into more than 10,000 pieces. According to Good, the team's name was based on an Internet meme "All your base are belong to us".

== Other teams ==
Second placed team, "Schroddon", was composed just of husband and wife Marianne and Don Engel living in Baltimore, Maryland. In contrast to the winning team, Schroddon used a human-assisted algorithm that the couple created. Both physicists, Marianne used her background in cryptography and Don used his background in computer science. The couple was ranked first from November 14 until November 18, 2011.

University of California, San Diego (UCSD) reconstructed three puzzles through an online crowdsourcing approach, but their work-in-progress was repeatedly sabotaged.

== Top performing teams ==
In the final standings, the top 10 teams reported are:

Place	Name	Points
1	All Your Shreds are Belong to U.S.	50
2	Schroddon	30
3	wasabi	26
4	MKI	22
5	mmvd	22
6	UCSD	22
7	Craig Landrum	19
8	mkelly	19
9	Icandoit	19
10	Goldsong	17

== See also ==
- List of computer science awards
- DARPA
- DARPA Network Challenge
- DARPA Grand Challenge
- DARPA Prize Competitions
