= Tag Challenge =

Simulated manhunt challenge

The Tag Challenge is a social gaming competition, with a US$5,000 reward, in which participants were invited to find five "suspects" in a simulated law enforcement search in five different cities throughout North America and Europe on March 31, 2012. It aimed to determine whether and how social media can be used to accomplish a realistic, time-sensitive, international law enforcement objective. The challenge was won by a team that located 3 of the 5 suspects.

== Challenge description ==
The objective of the challenge was to be the first to locate and photograph five volunteer "suspects" in five different cities: Washington DC, New York City, London, Stockholm and Bratislava in Slovakia. At 8:00am local time, the organizers posted on their website a mug shot of each suspect on the day of the event. Each suspect wore a shirt bearing the event logo. The suspect's face, dress, and the contest logo were clearly visible in each of the mug shots. Contestants used only this photograph and a brief description provided on the event website to identify each suspect. The photos would be verified through a unique code on both the front and back of the shirt, which was not revealed in a suspect's mug shot but known only to the organizers. Participants had to make sure that the code phrase is clearly visible in each submission. The winning team or individual would receive up to US$5,000 in reward.

The challenge was created by an international group of graduate students from six countries, led by George Washington University graduate student J.R. deLara. The challenge is advertised as an "independent, nonprofit event," but it is being sponsored by the US State Department and the US Embassy in Prague.

=== Role of social media ===
The scale of the challenge means that no single person or group of friends can tackle it on their own. Instead, winning was likely to rely on the ability to assemble a very large, ad hoc team of spotters. As such, the Tag Challenge is an example of crowdsourcing, an approach to accomplishing tasks by opening them to the public. It is similar to the DARPA Network Challenge, in which teams competed to locate 10 red weather balloons placed at random locations all over the United States. However, the Tag Challenge was expected to be significantly harder, due to the international distribution of the targets over so many countries and, more importantly, the fact that they were mobile.

== Teams ==
Given the scale and geographical distribution of the challenge, the most likely winner was going to be a team rather than an individual.

- CrowdScanner: Organized by computer scientists from UCSD, Masdar Institute, and University of Southampton and led by Iyad Rahwan, this team included one of the winners of the DARPA Network Challenge. The strategy, based on the DARPA Network Challenge winning strategy, was as follows:

"You receive $500 if you upload an image of a suspect that is accepted by the challenge organizers. If a friend you invited using your individualized referral link uploads an acceptable image of a suspect, YOU also get $100. Furthermore, recruiters of the first 2000 recruits who signed up by referral get $1 for each recruit they refer to sign up with us (using the individualized referral link)."

- TagTeam_: The Tag Team group was run by a diverse group of individuals with backgrounds including international relations from the University of Chicago, statistics from Georgetown University, and computer science from the Massachusetts Institute of Technology and George Washington University. Their strategy was to promise to distribute whatever winnings they receive to local charities, the individuals who locate the suspects, and those who provide a reference to a person to locates the suspects.

== Outcome ==
The challenge took place on March 31, 2012. Entries were accepted until noon, 12:00 pm, EST on April 1, 2012. The organizers announced the winning team to be CrowdScanner, having located 3 among the 5 targets.

== Analysis ==
The winning team subsequently published extensive analysis of the data from their social media campaign. It was found that during the challenge, people were "able to consistently route information in a targeted fashion even under increasing time pressure." Using a model of social-media fueled global mobilization, the authors estimated that during the most time-critical portion of the challenge, one in three social messages were geographically targeted. A blog on MIT Technology Review dubbed this ability "12 hours of separation" in homage to the Six degrees of separation theory.
