= DARPA Spectrum Challenge =

The DARPA Spectrum Challenge was a competition held by the Defense Advanced Research Projects Agency to demonstrate a radio protocol that can best use a given communication channel in the presence of other dynamic users and interfering signals.

The challenge was not focused on developing new radio hardware, but instead was targeted at finding strategies for guaranteeing successful communication in the presence of other radios that may have conflicting co-existence objectives. The challenge entailed head-to-head competitions between each team's radio protocol and an opponent's in a structured wireless testbed environment, known as ORBIT, that is maintained by the Wireless Information Network Laboratory (WINLAB) at Rutgers University.

The challenge awarded first place teams in the September 2013 preliminary event, and first and second place teams in the March 2014 final event with cash prizes totaling $200,000. Each event consisted of a Competitive and Cooperative Tournament.

== Qualifying teams ==
Out of the 90 teams that registered for the Spectrum Challenge, the top 18 teams were selected to compete in the preliminary and final event:

Team name	Affiliation	Location	Qualification ranking	Tournament winnings
Purdue	Purdue University, Raytheon BBN	West Lafayette, Indiana	1	$0
Efficient Spectrum	Individuals	Centreville, Virginia	2	$75,000; 1st place final competitive 2nd place final cooperative
WSL-NEU	Northeastern University	Boston, Massachusetts	3	$25,000; 1st place preliminary cooperative
MarmotE	Vanderbilt University, ISIS	Nashville, Tennessee	5	$25,000; 1st place preliminary competitive
Gator Wings	University of Florida	Gainesville, Florida	6	$0
Spartans	San Jose State University	San Jose, California	7	$0
RxTx	Individuals	San Diego, California	8	$0
VT-Hume	Virginia Tech	Blacksburg, Virginia	9	$0
wasabi	Individual	Seattle, Washington	10	$0
VT CogRad	Virginia Tech	Blacksburg, Virginia	11	$0
The Orange Wireless Warriors	Syracuse University	Syracuse, New York	12	$0
Wireless Infidels	Polytechnic Institute of NYU	Brooklyn, New York	13	$0
Georgia Tech Research Institute	Georgia Tech Research Institute	Atlanta, Georgia	14	$25,000; 2nd place final competitive
Wildcats	Northwestern University	Evanston, Illinois	15	$0
Notre Spectrum	Notre Dame University	South Bend, Indiana	Competitive Mode Wildcard Winner	$0
KPE	Individuals	Albuquerque, New Mexico	Cooperative Mode Wildcard Winner	$0
Tennessee Tech Telecom	Tennessee Technological University	Cookeville, Tennessee	Overall Average Score Wildcard Winner	$50,000; 1st place final cooperative
Buzz Radio	Georgia Institute of Technology	Atlanta, Georgia	2nd place overall average score wildcard winner	$0
