= Telecommunications Intercept and Collection Technology Unit =

Government agency (subunit)

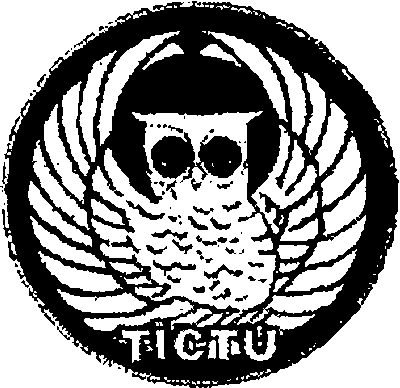
Official logo of TICTU, scanned from documents obtained via the Freedom of Information Act.

The Telecommunications Intercept and Collection Technology Unit (TICTU) is part of the Electronic Surveillance Technology Section (ESTS) of the Federal Bureau of Investigation (FBI). Its primary function is performing surveillance of U.S. citizens.

The TICTU is in charge of operating and maintaining DCSNet, and performs millions of domestic wiretaps each year.

== See also ==
- Carnivore (software)
- Communications Assistance For Law Enforcement Act
- DCSNET
- Mass Surveillance
