= Topsail (disambiguation) =

A topsail is the second square sail up a mast in a sailboat. Topsail may also refer to:

== In geography ==
=== Canada ===
- Topsail, Newfoundland and Labrador, a community in Conception Bay South, Newfoundland and Labrador, Canada
  - Topsail (electoral district), a former provincial electoral district in Newfoundland and Labrador

=== United States ===
- Topsail Island, one of the barrier islands on the southern coast of North Carolina, USA
  - Topsail Beach, North Carolina, a community on the southern part of Topsail Island
  - North Topsail Beach, North Carolina, a community on the northern part of Topsail Island

== In other uses ==
- Topsail, a software project originating with U.S. Department of Defense's Information Awareness Office and later moved for further development with the National Security Agency

== See also ==
- Edward Topsell (1572–1625), English author
