= Project Genoa II =

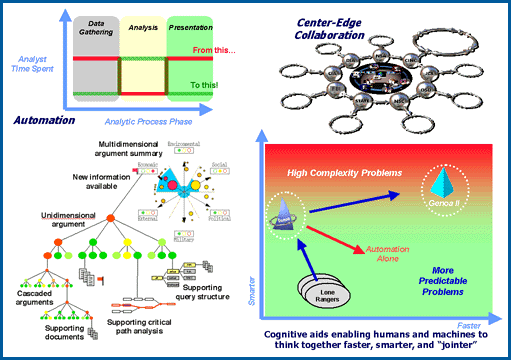
Graphic from the Information Awareness Office displaying the goals of the Genoa II project

Project Genoa II was a software project that originated with the United States Defense Advanced Research Projects Agency's Information Awareness Office and the successor to the Genoa program. Originally part of DARPA's wider Total Information Awareness project, it was later renamed Topsail and handed over to the Advanced Research and Development Activity for further development.

== Program synopsis ==
Genoa II was scheduled to be a five-year-long program. It followed up on the research initiated by the first Genoa project. While Genoa primarily focused on intelligence analyses, Genoa II was aimed towards providing means with which computers, software agents, policy makers, and field operatives could collaborate. Eleven different contractors were involved in its development.

=== Mission ===
The official goals of Genoa II were to develop and deploy the following:

1. Cognitive aids that allow humans and machines to "think together" in real-time about complicated problems.

2. Means to overcome the biases and limitations of the human cognitive system.

3. "Cognitive amplifiers" that help teams of people rapidly and fully comprehend complicated and uncertain situations.

4. The means to rapidly cut across and complement existing stove-piped hierarchical organizational structures by creating dynamic, adaptable, peer-to-peer collaborative networks.

== History ==
In 2002, Tom Armour, a veteran of the Genoa project, was selected by John Poindexter to be the director of the new Genoa II program, a component of Total Information Awareness (TIA) effort. It was commissioned under the cost of $54 million.

In late 2003 TIA was officially shut down by Congress due to unfavorable views from the public. Most of its research was salvaged and its components were transferred to other government agencies for development. Genoa II was renamed Topsail and handed over to the National Security Agency's Advanced Research and Development Activity division for further work. In October 2005, the Science Applications International Corporation signed a $3.7 million contract for work on Topsail.

Tools from the program were utilized in the war in Afghanistan and in other efforts as part of the war on terror.

In early 2006 a spokesman for the Air Force Research Laboratory said that Topsail was "in the process of being canceled due to lack of funds." When inquired about Topsail in a Senate Intelligence Committee hearing that February, both National Intelligence Director John Negroponte and FBI Director Robert Mueller said they didn't know about the program's status. Negroponte's deputy, former NSA Director Michael V. Hayden said, "I'd like to answer in closed session."
