= Data Loading and Analysis System =

The Data Loading and Analysis System (DaLAS) is an electronic database used by the Federal Bureau of Investigation and United States Intelligence Community for counterintelligence and counterterrorism investigations. It is used to store copies of seized digital media, including disk images of CD-ROMs, DVDs, hard drives, mobile phones, and raw network feeds, as well as scans of physical documents. DaLAS supports the upload, processing, and classification of media, and provides a central, remotely accessed, searchable repository of data. The full details of DaLAS, including the number of files and total amount of stored data, are classified.

During a 2011 investigation in the aftermath of the 2009 Fort Hood shooting, a query of Nidal Malik Hasan's personal email account returned a result on a hard drive image stored on DaLAS. The drive had been seized in 2007 in an unrelated New Jersey tax case. The match was a message posted to a web forum by Hasan on February 10, 2005, asking whether doctors should prescribe intoxicating medications under Sharia law.

== See also ==
- Investigative Data Warehouse
- Data Warehouse System Electronic Surveillance Data Management System
