= Bill Breeden (minister) =

American minister

Bill Breeden is a retired Unitarian Universalist minister, former candidate for the Indiana House of Representatives, death penalty opponent, and civil activist. Breeden remains the only person connected to the Iran-Contra Affair who served jail time. His act of political protest is the subject of a 1994 documentary.

== Early life ==
Breeden was born and spent the early part of his life in Odon, Indiana. He began preaching at revivals at age 15. He married his wife Glenda at age 19. Breeden earned his Bachelor's degree from Trevecca Nazarene University in 1972 and his Masters of Divinity from Nazarene Theological Seminary. Undergoing spiritual transition, Breeden left the evangelical church and joined the mainline Christian Church, Disciples of Christ, during the early 1970s. During the 1980s, Breeden and his family lived in a teepee in Brown County, Indiana.

== Political Protest ==
In 1986, John Poindexter resigned as President Ronald Reagan's national security advisor as he participated in the then-ongoing Iran–Contra affair. To show support for its native son, Odon Indiana city officials named a street after Poindexter and unveiled the sign shortly after his resignation. Breeden was angry that Poindexter had broken several laws and lied to the American public, and was being rewarded. This led him, and a high school friend, to steal the sign and hold it for ransom for $30 million; the same amount allegedly diverted to the Contras. Law enforcement did not approve of Breeden's actions and immediately issued a warrant for his arrest. Three days after the theft of the sign, Breeden was arrested.

After the trial, Breeden was sentenced and served four days in jail. To date, he has been the only person associated with the Iran-Contra affair to serve any jail time. This event led to the 1994 documentary 'The Times of a Sign.'

== Political career ==
In 2016, Breeden was the Democratic candidate for the Indiana House of Representatives District 46 running against Republican incumbent Bob Heaton. Breeden campaigned in a Volkswagen Beetle, which was also featured in his campaign commercial. Breeden lost the race by almost 30 points.

== Opposition to death penalty ==
Breeden is a fierce opponent of capital punishment and since the 1990s, he has served as a spiritual advisor to inmates on death row.

As of May 2023, Breeden was a plaintiff in a federal lawsuit, seeking to give federal death row inmates more time outside their cells and the ability to congregate together. The suit was filed in response to a 2021 death row execution, in which Breeden was not allowed to physically console a death row inmate prior to his execution or read a statement he had prepared. The suit alleges these actions violated the Religious Freedom Restoration Act.
