= Saffron Technology =

Technology Company

Saffron Technology, Inc., was a technology company headquartered in Cary, North Carolina, that developed cognitive computing systems. Their systems use incremental learning to understand and unify by entity (person, place or thing) the connections between an entity and other “things” in data, along with the context of their connections and their raw frequency counts. Saffron learns from all sources of data including structured and unstructured data to support knowledge-based decision making. Its patented technology captures the connections between data points at the entity level and stores these connections in an associative memory. Similarity algorithms and predictive analytics are then combined with the associative index to identify patterns in the data. Saffron’s Natural Intelligence platform was utilized across industries including manufacturing, energy, defense and healthcare, to help decision-makers manage risks, identify opportunities and anticipate future outcomes, thus reducing cost and increasing productivity. Its competitors included IBM Watson and Grok. As a Saffron customer and investor, Intel purchased the company in 2015. Intel announced Saffron's decision support product for manufacturing, including Intel's own internal use, but discontinued Saffron's external product and service offerings three years after its acquisition.

== History ==
Saffron was founded in 1999 by Dr Manuel Aparicio, and Mr. James Fleming.

In 2000, former National Security Advisor Admiral (Dr.) John Poindexter joined the board with a focus of applying Associative Memory technology in the fields of National Security and Intelligence.

In the first years, the company did most of its work with the U.S. Department of Defense, including in Iraq, analyzing and predicting where IED’s would be located so insurgent bombers could be proactively targeted.

On March 3, 2014 Saffron Technology raised a round of Series B funding.

In October 2015, Intel bought Saffron Technology for an undisclosed price. Intel offered the licensed software with engineering services contracted to develop client applications and support ongoing use.

In August 2018, Intel discontinued the Saffron software offering and supporting engineering services. Intel never issued a press release.

== National security ==
During the Iraqi insurgency Saffron was used by coalition forces in Iraq to help identify entities that were defined as people, places, and things involved in insurgent networks.

Saffron was contracted by DARPA to work on Project Genoa.

== Industry ==
Saffron's Natural Intelligence platform was utilized by Global 1000 companies across industries including manufacturing, energy, defense and healthcare.
