= Project Genoa =

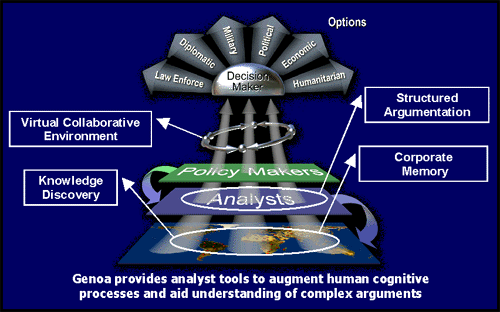
Graphic from the Information Awareness Office displaying the goals of the Genoa project

Project Genoa was a software project commissioned by the United States' DARPA which was designed to analyze large amounts of data and metadata to help human analysts counter terrorism.

== Program synopsis ==
Genoa's primary function was intelligence analysis in order to assist human analysts.

The program was designed to support both top-down and bottom-up approaches; a policy maker could hypothesize a possible attack and use Genoa to look for supporting evidence of such a plot, or it would compile pieces of intelligence into a diagram and suggest possible outcomes. Human analysts would then be able to modify the diagram to test various cases.

Companies such as Integral Visuals, Saffron Technology, and Syntek Technologies were involved in Genoa's development. It cost a total of $42 million to complete the program.

== History ==
Genoa was conceived in late 1995 by retired Rear Admiral John Poindexter, a chief player in the Iran-Contra Affair. At the time, Poindexter was working at Syntek, a company often contracted to do work for the Department of Defense. He proposed a computer system that would help humans crunch large amounts of data in order to more effectively predict potential national security threats. Poindexter brought his ideas to former colleagues working with the United States National Security Council.

That year, a team of researchers was assembled for the project and began studying various historical events to which Genoa could be applied. The Tokyo subway sarin attack in March was the primary focus. Instead of analyzing the attack itself, the researchers looked into the history of Aum Shinrikyo, the group that perpetrated the attack, to find evidence that could have suggested their intentions.

In order to pitch their ideas, the researchers set up a mock crisis command center in DARPA's main building, full of monitors staffed by actors. An audience would watch as a fictitious scenario would unfold before them, guided along by an animated video segment. Poindexter called the presentation "A Day in the Life of an Analyst." Another mock center was set up near the DARPA building with the help of a Hollywood set designer to serve the same purpose. Prominent viewers of the exhibition included Richard A. Clarke, John Michael McConnell, and James R. Clapper.

Genoa was commissioned in 1996 for development overseen by DARPA and completed in the 2002 fiscal year, becoming a component of the Total Information Awareness program. It was concluded that while Genoa helped officials better understand complex situations, it operated at a slow speed. The research initiated by the project was continued in its immediate follow-on program, Genoa II. One of the goals of this successor was to increase the speed of analyses.

The program was actively utilized by the Defense Intelligence Agency.
