= MiTAP =

Computer system that processes and presents information

MiTAP, or Mitre Text and Audio Processing, is a computer system that tries to automatically gather, translate, organize, and present information "for monitoring infectious disease outbreaks and other global events." It is also used in the FBI Investigative Data Warehouse.

== Sources ==
"Multiple information sources in multiple languages are automatically captured, filtered, translated, summarized, and categorized"

It uses 'web sources, electronic mailing lists, newsgroups, news feeds, and audio-video data.'. The audio-video is automatically transcribed into text by the ViTAP system.

== Guts ==
In 2002 it was reported to have used CyberTrans, the Alembic natural language analyzer, WebSumm summarizer, Lucene indexing, NewsBlaster from Columbia, Brill tagging, SOAP, HTML, NNTP, Perl, Unix scripts, and other tools. Upgrades to various components are planned.

== Creators ==
It was created at the Mitre Corporation by Damianos and a team of other researchers, with public release in 2001.

== Usage ==
It is being used by the FBI as part of their Investigative Data Warehouse via DARPA's TIDES program. According to 2004 FBI email, MiTAP was running at San Diego State University, collecting only English language website news. It mentioned a plan to have FBI run its own version of MiTAP.

It has also been used by people in the White House, the Department of Homeland Security, the Pentagon, the American Red Cross, the United Nations, and the European Disaster Center

== Bibliography ==
- Damianos, Laurie, and Jay Ponte, Steve Wohlever, Florence Reeder, David Day, George Wilson and Lynette Hirschman (2002). "MiTAP for Biosecurity: A Case Study". AI Magazine. 23 (4). doi:10.1609/aimag.v23i4.1666.
- Damianos, Laurie, and Jay Ponte, Steve Wohlever, Florence Reeder, David Day, George Wilson and Lynette Hirschman (2002). "MiTAP, Text and Audio Processing for Bio-Security: A Case Study" (PDF). AAAI-02 Proceedings. American Association for Artificial Intelligence.
- Damianos, Laurie. Guido Zareella & Lynette Hirschman (August 2004). "The MiTAP System for Monitoring Reports of Disease Outbreak". Mitre Corporation.
- FBI Information Resources Division, Data and Information Management Section (2003-12-03). "Investigative Data Warehouse Integration System (IDW-I) System Security Plan" (PDF). Electronic Frontier Foundation. p. Page 58 of linked PDF.
- FBI Office of the Program Management Executive (2004-11-29). "Security Concept of Operations (S-CONOPS), Investigative Data Warehouse (IDW) Program" (PDF). Electronic Frontier Foundation. p. Page 50 of linked PDF.
- "EFF Freedom of Information Act (FOIA) files, 2008 April 8, idw02" (PDF). Electronic Frontier Foundation. (Contains various emails from inside the FBI regarding the IDW)
