= Multimedia Web Ontology Language =

Machine interpretation of documents and services in Semantic Web environment is primarily enabled by (a) the capability to mark documents, document segments and services with semantic tags and (b) the ability to establish contextual relations between the tags with a domain model, which is formally represented as ontology. Human beings use natural languages to communicate an abstract view of the world. Natural language constructs are symbolic representations of human experience and are close to the conceptual model that Semantic Web technologies deal with. Thus, natural language constructs have been naturally used to represent the ontology elements. This makes it convenient to apply Semantic Web technologies in the domain of textual information. In contrast, multimedia documents are perceptual recording of human experience. An attempt to use a conceptual model to interpret the perceptual records gets severely impaired by the semantic gap that exists between the perceptual media features and the conceptual world. Notably, the concepts have their roots in perceptual experience of human beings and the apparent disconnect between the conceptual and the perceptual world is rather artificial. The key to semantic processing of multimedia data lies in harmonizing the seemingly isolated conceptual and the perceptual worlds. Representation of the Domain knowledge needs to be extended to enable perceptual modeling, over and above conceptual modeling that is supported. The perceptual model of a domain primarily comprises observable media properties of the concepts. Such perceptual models are useful for semantic interpretation of media documents, just as the conceptual models help in the semantic interpretation of textual documents.

Multimedia Ontology language (M-OWL) is an ontology representation language that enables such perceptual modeling. It assumes a causal model of the world, where observable media features are caused by underlying concepts. In MOWL, it is possible to associate different types of media features in different media format and at different levels of abstraction with the concepts in a closed domain. The associations are probabilistic in nature to account for inherent uncertainties in observation of media patterns. The spatial and temporal relations between the media properties characterizing a concept (or, event) can also be expressed using MOWL. Often the concepts in a domain inherit the media properties of some related concepts, such as a historic monument inheriting the color and texture properties of its building material. It is possible to reason with the media properties of the concepts in a domain to derive an Observation Model for a concept. Finally, MOWL supports an abductive reasoning framework using Bayesian networks, that is robust against imperfect observations of media data.

== History ==
W3C forum has undertaken the initiative of standardizing the ontology representation for web-based applications. The Web Ontology Language (OWL), standardized in 2004 after maturing through XML(S), RDF(S) and DAML+OIL is a result of that effort. Ontology in OWL (and some of its predecessor languages) has been successfully used in establishing semantics of text in specific application contexts.

The concepts and properties in these traditional ontology languages are expressed as text, making an ontology readily usable for semantic analysis of textual documents. Semantic processing of media data calls for perceptual modeling of domain concepts with their media properties. M-OWL has been proposed as an ontology language that enables such perceptual modeling. While M-OWL is a syntactic extension of OWL, it uses a completely different semantics based on probabilistic causal model of the world.

== Key features ==
Syntactically, MOWL is an extension of OWL. These extensions enable

- Definition of media properties following MPEG-7 media description model.
- Probabilistic association of media properties with the domain concepts.
- Formal semantics to the media properties to enable reasoning.
- Formal semantics for spatio-temporal relations across media objects and events.

MOWL is accompanied with reasoning tools that support

- Construction of model of observation for a concept in multimedia documents with expected media properties.
- Probabilistic (Bayesian) reasoning for concept recognition with the model of observation.

== See also ==
- Large Scale Concept Ontology for Multimedia
- Ontology for Media Resources

== Bibliography ==
- H Ghosh, S Chaudhury and A Mallik. Ontology for multimedia applications. IEEE Intelligent Informatics Bulletin. 14(1). December 2013.
- A Mallik, H Ghosh, G Harit and S Chaudhury. MOWL: An Ontology Representation Language for Web based Multimedia Applications. ACM Transactions of Multimedia Computing, Communications and Applications (TOMCCAP). 10(1). December 2013.
- S Ajmani, H Ghosh, A Mallik and S Chaudhury. An ontology based personalized garment recommendation system. Workshop on Personalization, Recommender Systems and Social Media. Web Intelligence. USA, Nov 17–20, 2013.
- A Mallik, S Chaudhury and H Ghosh. Nrityakosha: Preserving the Intangible Heritage of Indian Classical Dance. In ACM Journal of Computing and Cultural Heritage. 4(3), December 2011.
- A Malik, S Chaudhury, H Ghosh, Preservation of Intangible Heritage: A case-study of Indian Classical Dance. In eHeritage 2010: 2nd ACM Workshop on eHeritage and Digital Art Preservation [ACM Multimedia Conference], October 2010.
- S Chaudhury and H Ghosh. Ontology based access to heritage artefacts on the web. In Multimedia Information Extraction and Digital Heritage Preservation. Ed. B.B. Chaudhuri and U. Munshi. World Scientific Pub Co. Inc., Mar. 2011
- H. Ghosh, G. Harit and S. Chaudhury. Using ontology for building distributed digital libraries with multimedia contents. World Digital Library, 1(2), Dec 2008, pp. 83–100.
- S. Wattamwar and H. Ghosh. Spatio-Temporal Query for Multimedia Database. Workshop on Multimedia Semantics. ACM Multimedia Conference 2008, Vancouver (Canada), October 2008
- H. Ghosh, P. Poornachandra, A. Mallik and S. Chaudhury. Learning Ontology for Personalized Video Retrieval. International Workshop on Many Faces of Multimedia Semantics (WMS07), ACM Multimedia Conference, Augsberg (Germany) September 2007.
- H.Ghosh, S. Chaudhury, K. Kashyap and B. Maiti. Ontology Specification and Integration for Multimedia Applications. In Ontologies in the Context of Information Systems, Ed. R. Sharman, R. Kishore and R. Ramesh. Springer, 2007, pp. 265–296
- H.Ghosh, G. Harit and S. Chaudhury. Ontology based interaction with multimedia collections. International Conference on Digital Libraries, New Delhi, 2006.
- G. Harit, S. Chaudhury and H. Ghosh. Using Multimedia Ontology for generating conceptual annotations and hyperlinks in video collections. International conference on Web Intelligence, Hong Kong, 2006.
- T. Karthik, S. Chaudhury and H. Ghosh. Specifying Spatio-Temporal Relations in Multimedia Ontologies. International Conference of Pattern Recognition and Machine Intelligence, Kolkata 2005.
- H. Ghosh and S. Chaudhury. Distributed and Reactive Query Planning in R-MAGIC: An Agent-based Multimedia Retrieval System. IEEE Trans KDE, 16(9), Sep 2004.
- H. Ghosh, N. Rajarathnam and S. Chaudhury. Knowledge Representation for Web-based Services in a Multi-cultural Environment. IEEE International Workshop on Website Evolution (WSE-2001), Florence, Nov 2001.
