= Marc Zwillinger =

American lawyer (born 1969)

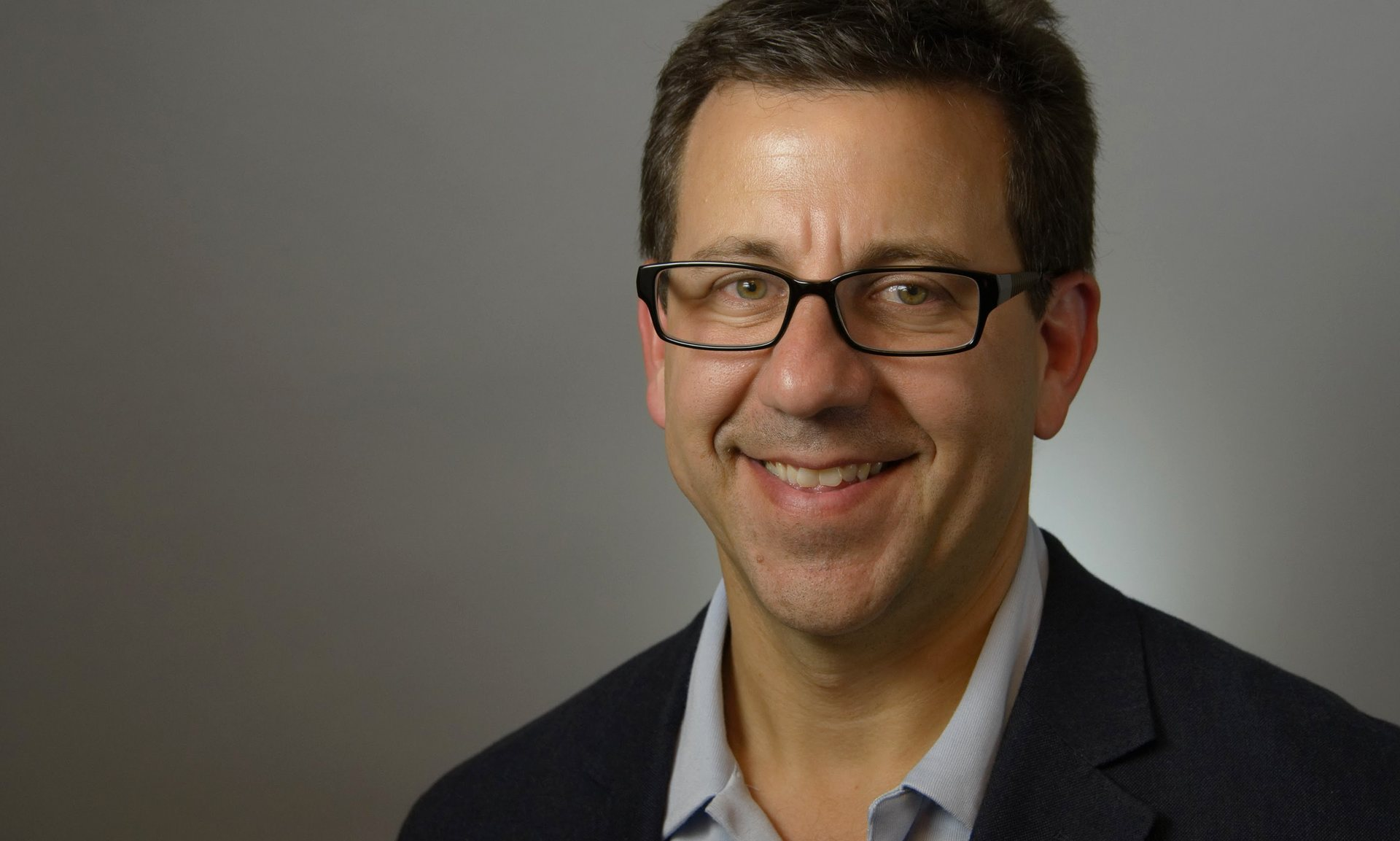
- Education: Tufts University; Harvard Law School
- Occupation: Lawyer
- Title: Founder and managing member of ZwillGen

Marc Zwillinger is an American lawyer, who founded ZwillGen, a Washington, D.C.–based law firm focused on data privacy and information security. He has been active in the field of Internet law, and has represented technology companies in disputes over government access to user data.

== Education ==
Marc earned his bachelor's degree from Tufts University in 1991, and received his Juris Doctor degree graduating magna cum laude from Harvard Law School in 1994.

== Career ==
After graduating from Harvard Law School in 1994, Zwillinger worked with U.S. District Judge Mark L. Wolf. From 1995 to 1997, he worked as a litigation associate for Kirkland & Ellis and a trial attorney from 1997 to 2000 in the U.S. Department of Justice’s Computer Crime and Intellectual Property Section. Zwillinger was a partner at Sonnenschein Nath & Rosenthal in the firm's Internet, Communications & Data Protection Group where he had created the Internet, Communications and Data Protection Practice Group (originally called Information Security and Anti-Piracy).

Zwillinger founded Zwillinger Genetski LLP (now ZwillGen PLLC), a boutique law firm specializing in data protection and information security, in March 2010. In November 25, 2015, Zwillinger was designated eligible as an amicus curiae in proceedings before the Foreign Intelligence Surveillance Court and the Foreign Intelligence Court of Review. In 2016, he argued as a court-appointed amicus before the FISCR in In re Certified Question of Law, 858 F.3d 591 (2016).

=== Work with Apple ===
Zwillinger represented Apple in legal disputes concerning government access to data on electronic devices. In 2015, Zwillinger, representing Apple, contested unlocking an iPhone 5S belonging to a defendant accused of selling drugs in New York. In 2016, Zwillinger represented Apple in the Apple vs San Bernardino case where the government sought to compel Apple to unlock the personal iPhone recovered from one of the terrorists in the San Bernardino attack. The case itself was later dropped.

=== Work with Yahoo ===
In 2008 Zwillinger represented Yahoo! over the government's efforts to force Yahoo! to comply with "surveillance orders and other types of legal process in national security investigations." Zwillinger was one of the lawyers who represented Yahoo in its historic challenge to the government's surveillance program in the Foreign Intelligence Surveillance Court ("FISC") and the Foreign Intelligence Court of Review ("FISCR").

== Service ==
Zwillinger is one of five amici curiae appointed to serve to the Foreign Intelligence Surveillance Court ("FISC"); a position stipulated under the USA Freedom Act. Amici serve staggered terms, with Zwillinger slated to serve a four-year term.

== Awards ==
From 2007 through 2015, Zwillinger has been ranked in Chambers & Partners USA as a leading lawyer in his field of Privacy & Data Security. In 2026, Chambers USA ranked Zwillinger as Band 1 and Band 3 in the Privacy & Data Security categories.
