= Disruptive Technology Office =

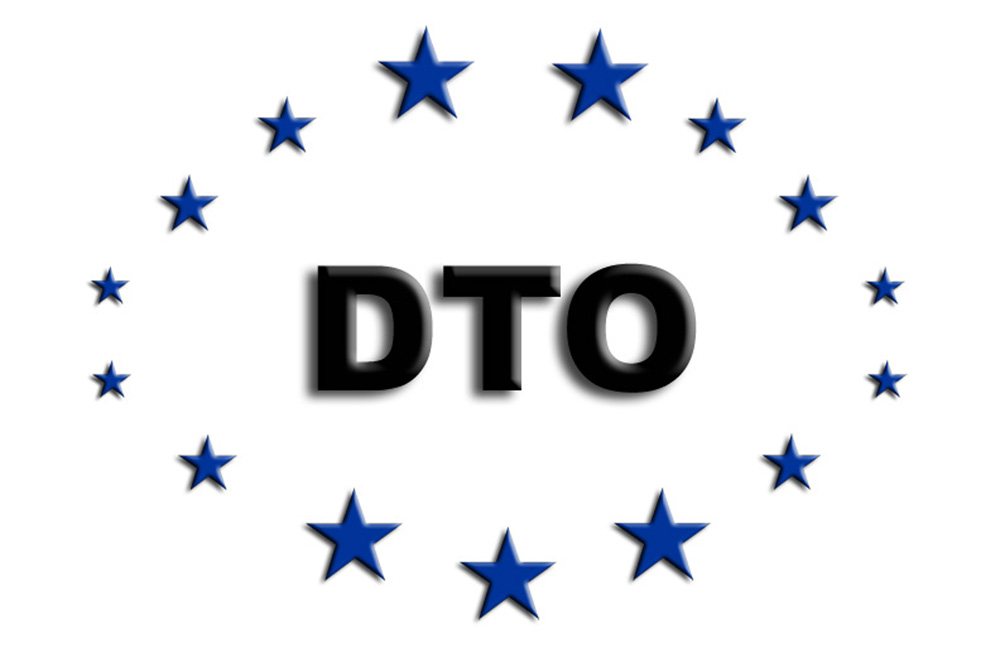

The Disruptive Technology Office (DTO) was a funding agency within the United States Intelligence Community. It was previously known as the Advanced Research and Development Activity (ARDA). In December 2007, DTO was folded into the newly created IARPA.

ARDA was created in 1998 after the model of DARPA by the Director of Central Intelligence and the Department of Defense, and took responsibility for funding some of DARPA's projects. ARDA evaluates proposals and funds speculative research, particularly in the fields of data mining, video processing, and quantum computing.

There has been speculation that the DTO is continuing research efforts started under the Total Information Awareness program (TIA) in DARPA's Information Awareness Office (IAO). Data-mining activities within the US Department of Defense are controversial and have met with public and congressional disapproval.

Although ARDA's budget is presumably classified as part of the intelligence budget, the New York Times quoted an unnamed former government official saying the agency spent about $100 million a year in 2003. The Associated Press reports that ARDA had a staff of only eight in 2004.

Headquartered at Fort George G. Meade in Maryland, site of the headquarters of the National Security Agency, ARDA/DTO has kept a low profile, quietly funding research of interest to the intelligence community. A move to a research park near the University of Maryland, College Park was announced at about the same time as the consolidation into IARPA.

== See also ==
- Disruptive technology
- Large Scale Concept Ontology for Multimedia

== Sources ==
- Lanyon, B.P.; et al. "Experimental demonstration of Shor's algorithm with quantum entanglement" (PDF). Brisbane, Australia: Centre for Quantum Computer Technology and Department of Physics, University of Queensland. Archived from the original (PDF) on 20 July 2008. Work on cracking public-key encryption using a quantum computer. "This work was supported in part by … US Disruptive Technologies Office … ". American Physical Society, Physical Review Letters, 21 December 2001 Alternative link
- Markoff, John. Experts Say Technology Is Widely Disseminated Inside and Outside Military", The New York Times, 21 May 2003.
- Jackson, William. Intelligence community seeks protection from inside threats GCN.com. 12 January 2004
- Sniffen, Miachel J. "U.S. High-Tech Spy Agency Has Low Profile Associated Press 22 February 2004.
- Sniffen, Miachel J. "Controversial terror research lives on at other agencies despite closing of Pentagon office Associated Press. 23 February 2004.
- Sniffen, Miachel J. "Privacy Safeguards Quietly Killed Associated Press 15 March 2005.
- Regan, Tom. "Report: NSA continues controversial data-mining program" Christian Science Monitor. 24 February 2006.
- Harris, Shane. "TIA Lives On... a controversial counter-terrorism..." National Journal. 23 February 2006.
- New Scientist article on the NSA continued data mining activities
