= Digital Collection System Network =

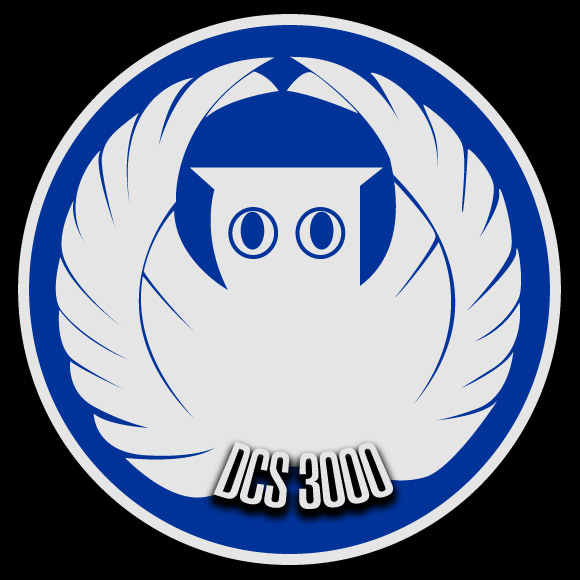
Official logo of DCS3000 system.

The Digital Collection System Network (DCSNet) is the Federal Bureau of Investigation (FBI)'s point-and-click surveillance system that can perform instant wiretaps on almost any telecommunications device in the United States.

It allows access to cellphone, landline, SMS communications anywhere in the US from a point-and-click interface. It runs on a fiber-optic backbone that is separate from the Internet. It is intended to increase agent productivity through workflow modeling, allowing for the routing of intercepts for translation or analysis with only a few clicks. The DCSNet real-time intelligence data intercept has the capability to record, review and playback intercepted material in real-time.

The DCSNet systems operate on a virtual private network parallel to the public Internet, with services provided at least for some time by the Sprint Peerless IP network.

Much of the information available on this system has come from the results of Freedom of Information Act (FOIA) requests made by the Electronic Frontier Foundation (EFF).

== Components ==
It is composed of at least three classified software components that run on the Windows operating system—DCS3000, DCS5000, DCS6000.

=== DCS-3000 ===
DCS-3000 and "Red Hook" were first mentioned publicly in a March 2006 report from the United States Department of Justice Office of the Inspector General (OIG) on the implementation of the Communications Assistance for Law Enforcement Act (CALEA). The report described Red Hook as "a system to collect voice and data calls and then process and display the intercepted information in the absence of a CALEA solution." and it described DCS-3000 "as an interim solution to intercept personal communications services delivered via emerging digital technologies used by wireless carriers in advance of any CALEA solutions being deployed."

Citing the OIG report, the Electronic Frontier Foundation (EFF) filed an FOIA request later that year in order to obtain more information about the two programs. When the FBI did not respond with more information, the EFF sued, and in May 2007 obtained a court order to release documents concerning the programs.

On August 29, 2007, Wired magazine published an article on these systems, citing the EFF documents. The DCS-3000 collects information associated with dialed and incoming numbers like traditional trap-and-trace and pen registers. The article named "Red Hook" as the client for DCS-3000. Wired reported that the DCS-3000 cost $320 per number targeted, and that the software is maintained by Booz Allen Hamilton.

=== DCS-5000 ===
The DCS-5000 is a system used by the FBI unit responsible for counter-intelligence to target suspected spies, alleged terrorists, and others with wiretaps.

=== DCS-6000 ===
The DCS-6000 (a.k.a. "Digital Storm") captures the content of phone calls and text messages for analysis. Once the data has been captured, it is indexed and prioritized using the Electronic Surveillance Data Management System (ELSUR).

== See also ==
- Carnivore (FBI)
- ECHELON
- Investigative Data Warehouse
- Mass surveillance
- Signals intelligence (SIGINT)
