= John Poindexter =

Retired American naval officer and Department of Defense official

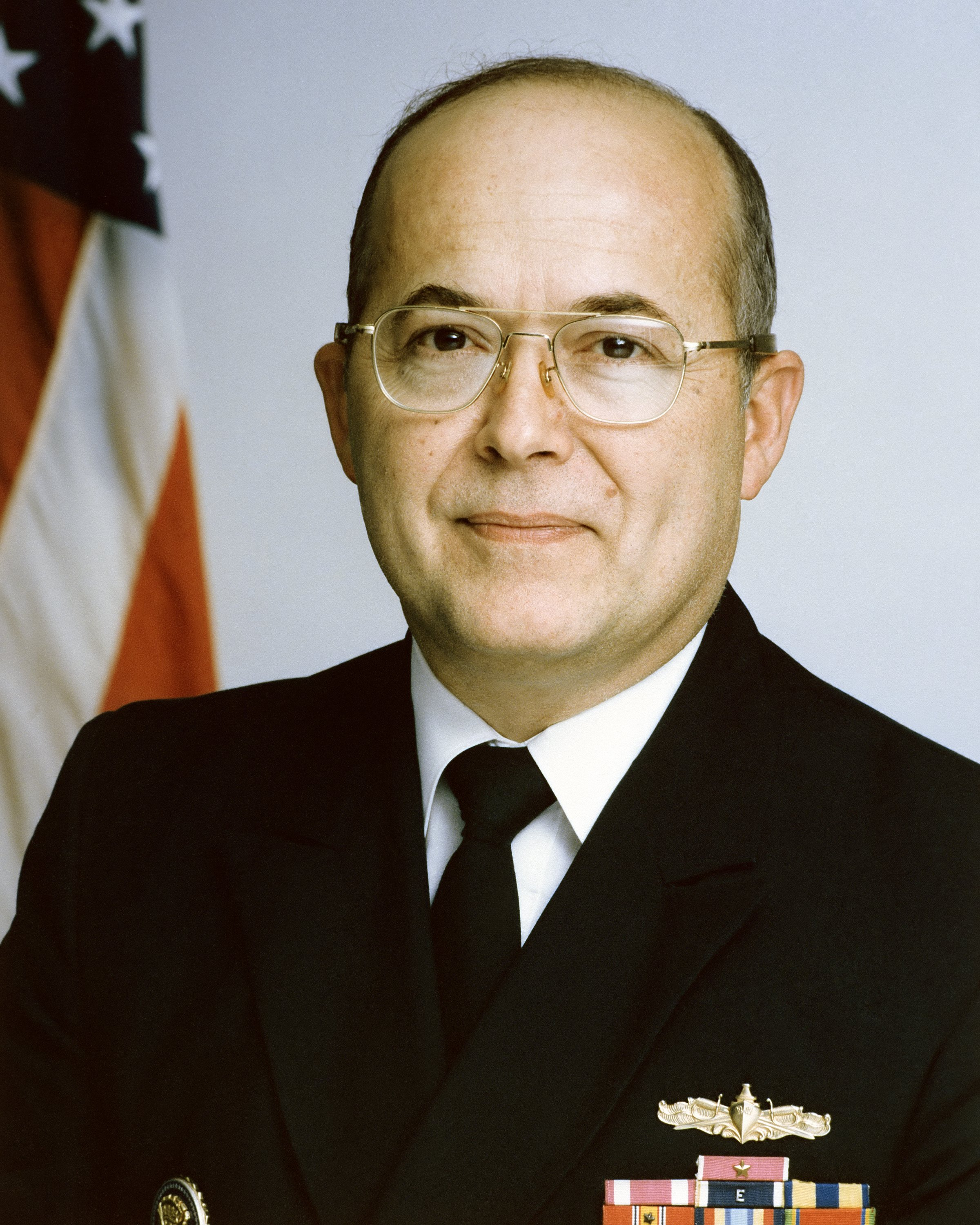
- Official portrait, 1985

13th United States National Security Advisor
- In office December 4, 1985 – November 25, 1986
- President: Ronald Reagan
- Preceded by: Robert McFarlane
- Succeeded by: Frank Carlucci

13th United States Deputy National Security Advisor
- In office October 17, 1983 – December 4, 1985
- President: Ronald Reagan
- Preceded by: Robert McFarlane
- Succeeded by: Donald Fortier

Personal details
- Born: John Marlan Poindexter; August 12, 1936 (age 90) Odon, Indiana, U.S.
- Party: Republican
- Spouse: Linda Poindexter
- Children: 5, including Dex
- Education: United States Naval Academy (BS); California Institute of Technology (MS, PhD)

Military service
- Allegiance: United States
- Branch/service: United States Navy
- Years of service: 1958–1987
- Rank: Vice Admiral; Retired as a Rear Admiral
- Commands: USS England; Destroyer Squadron 31
- Awards: Legion of Merit (2); Presidential Service Badge

John Marlan Poindexter (born August 12, 1936) is a retired United States naval officer and Department of Defense official. He was Deputy National Security Advisor and National Security Advisor during the Reagan administration. He was convicted in April 1990 of multiple felonies as a result of his actions in the Iran–Contra affair, but his convictions were reversed on appeal in 1991. During the George W. Bush administration, he served a brief stint as the director of the DARPA Information Awareness Office. He is the father of NASA astronaut and U.S. Navy Captain Alan G. Poindexter.

== Early life and career ==
Poindexter was born in Odon, Indiana, the son of Marlan G. and Ellen (Sommers) Poindexter. He received his undergraduate degree from the United States Naval Academy in 1958, where he graduated first in a class of 899. His fellow graduates included astronaut Bruce McCandless II (who graduated second) and Senator John McCain (who graduated 894th); previous National Security Advisor Robert McFarlane was a contemporary, graduating the following year.

Poindexter received an MS (1961) and PhD (1964) in nuclear physics from the California Institute of Technology. For his dissertation, he conducted laboratory research to further develop a model for understanding the Mössbauer effect with Nobel Laureate Rudolf Mössbauer.

== Senior naval career ==
While commander of Destroyer Squadron 31, Poindexter was surface warfare and anti-submarine warfare commander of battle groups in the Western Pacific Ocean and Indian Ocean, and he developed new tactics and battle management procedures under the Composite Warfare Commander concept. As the commanding officer of USS England, he pioneered the shipboard use of computers to manage the ship's force portion of yard overhauls. He was also an executive officer and a chief engineer of destroyers.

As deputy commander of the Naval Education and Training Command, he led the United States Navy's extensive education and training programs. He launched the development of a distributed data management system to better manage training pipelines.

His staff assignments included: executive assistant to the Chief of Naval Operations, administrative assistant to the Secretary of the Navy and special assistant for Systems Analysis to the Secretary of Defense. He reached the rank of vice admiral while serving as National Security Advisor, but was reverted to the rank of rear admiral in 1986 for his role in the Iran–Contra affair. He retired at that rank in 1987.

== U.S. executive branch service ==
Poindexter served in the Reagan administration as military assistant to the National Security Advisor from 1981 to 1983. From 1983 to 1985, he served as Deputy National Security Advisor, leading the National Security Council's Crisis Pre-planning Group. From 1985 to 1986, he was National Security Advisor, providing recommendations to the President on national security, foreign policy and defense policy.

He played a significant role in the Strategic Defense Initiative, Operation Urgent Fury, the Achille Lauro hijacking incident, Operation El Dorado Canyon (in response to Libyan terrorist attacks), and the Reykjavík Summit with the Soviets.

=== Iran–Contra affair ===
In the Iran–Contra affair, Poindexter and Oliver North sent aid to the Contras and money and weapons to Iran to secure the release of American hostages from Lebanon. This violated the Boland Amendment, which forbade the United States from directly or indirectly being involved with the Contras. Evidence revealed that Poindexter was a leader in the organization of the transfer of the weapons to Iran and oversaw other people involved in the affair, such as Oliver North.

Poindexter and North communicated through a channel known as the "Private Blank Check" which Poindexter set up on a National Security Council (NSC) computer. Through this system, Poindexter and North were able to send messages called PROFS notes back and forth without being intercepted by other NSC staff members. This system was not successful. Even though both Poindexter and North attempted to delete the messages, the White House Communications Agency was able to recover some of them, later used in trying Poindexter and North in court. On November 25, 1986, after the public disclosure of the Iran–Contra affair, Poindexter was forced to resign from his position as National Security Advisor.

Poindexter was convicted on April 7, 1990, of five counts of lying to Congress and obstructing the Congressional committees investigating the Iran–Contra affair, which were investigating the Reagan Administration's covert arms sales to Iran and the diversion of proceeds to insurgents fighting to overthrow the Sandinista government in Nicaragua. The convictions were reversed in 1991 on appeal on the grounds that several witnesses against him had been influenced by his testimony before Congress, even though Congress had given him immunity for that testimony.

To protest his involvement in the Iran-Contra Affair, Bill Breeden, a local minister and political activist, stole a street sign bearing Poindexter's name in his home town of Odon, Indiana. The sign was eventually returned but not before making national headlines and resulting in Breeden's arrest.

== Defense contractor work ==
From 1988 to 1989, Poindexter was senior scientist at Presearch, Inc., which had primarily been involved with defense studies and analysis. Faced with anticipated defense budget reductions, Poindexter joined the firm to develop new commercial enterprises. He designed and developed hardware and software for the prototype of a digital real-time imaging system to be used for physical security of high-value facilities. It was used to obtain a contract for a nuclear power plant security system.

From 1990 to 1996, Poindexter was the chief designer and programmer for TP Systems, Inc., a software development firm that he co-founded to specialize in commercial software for the IBM PCs and compatibles. Development included a symbolic debugger for multi-tasking environments, a BBS communications program, and numerous utility programs.

From 1993 to 1996, Poindexter served as a consultant to Elkins Group, a business alliance with Electronic Data Systems (EDS), that developed the Elkins Interactive Training Network (EITN), a satellite-based training delivery system. Poindexter was the chairman of the Maritime Advisory Committee and a member of Elkins' board of directors. He also provided advice on strategic planning.

From 1996 to 2002, Poindexter served as senior vice president for SYNTEK Technologies, a small high-technology firm with contracts in domestic and international defense and commercial business. Poindexter gave high-level advice on management and directed information systems projects (for example, Defense Advanced Research Project Agency's Project Genoa).

In 2000, he joined the board of Saffron Technology, where he played a role building a tool to run entity analysis on Iraqi insurgent networks that planted IEDs.

In 2007, he joined the board of Bright Planet Corporation.

After 2007, Poindexter worked to promote fraud-detecting Associative Memory Base technology to civilian government agencies such as the IRS.

== Recall to public service ==
Late in 2001, upon the recommendation of Science Applications International Corporation executive Brian Hicks, then-Vice President Dick Cheney recommended Admiral Poindexter to head a separate anti-terrorist office and serve under US Secretary of Defense Donald Rumsfeld.

=== Information Awareness Office ===
From January 2002 to August 2003, Poindexter served as the Director of the DARPA Information Awareness Office (IAO). The mission of the IAO was to imagine, develop, apply, integrate, demonstrate and move information technologies, components, and prototype closed-loop information systems. This aimed to counter asymmetric threats (most notably, terrorist threats) by achieving total information awareness and thus aiding preemption, national security warning, and national security decision making.

=== Policy Analysis Market ===
Poindexter faced criticism from the media and some politicians about the Policy Analysis Market project, a theoretical prediction market that would have rewarded participants for accurately predicting geopolitical trends in the Middle East and elsewhere. This was portrayed in the media as allowing participants to profit from the assassination of heads of state and acts of terrorism due to such events being mentioned on illustrative sample screens showing the interface. The controversy over the proposed futures market led to a Congressional audit of the IAO in general. Funding for the IAO was subsequently cut and Poindexter retired from DARPA on August 12, 2003.

== Family ==
His wife, Linda Poindexter, was an Episcopal priest for 13 years, but retired from the clergy when she converted to Catholicism. They have five sons, including the late Alan G. Poindexter, a NASA astronaut, Space Shuttle pilot on the STS-122 mission to the International Space Station, and the commander of STS-131, Mark Alan (* 1963), Joseph Chester (* 1971) and Daniel John.

Political offices
Preceded by Bud McFarlane	Deputy National Security Advisor; 1983–1985	Succeeded by Donald Fortier
Preceded by Bud McFarlane	National Security Advisor; 1985–1986	Succeeded by Frank Carlucci
